= List of Catholic dioceses in France in the 19th and 20th centuries =

In 1790, Pope Pius VI entirely revised the ecclesiastical map of France to fit the new administrative map: dioceses were now to coincide with departments (the new administrative units), and consequently all Ancien Régime dioceses disappeared. Many former bishoprics remained heads of the new dioceses, but many cities lost their bishop. But the papacy did not accept those changes, and for more than a decade, the new French ecclesiastical hierarchy was technically in schism with Rome.

In 1801, following the Concordate First Consul Napoleon Bonaparte signed with Pope Pius VI, a compromise was found, but it was not before the late 1810s that a stable ecclesiastical organisation was reached, in which one diocese was more or less coterminous with one department. A few exceptions were retained, especially in departments where there was a particularly numerous population.

In December 2002, Pope John Paul II completely redrew the map of French ecclesiastical provinces: for this, see the post-2002 List of the Roman Catholic dioceses of France.

The following is a list of French ecclesiastical provinces and dioceses from 1825 to 2002. Except where stated, one diocese coincided with one department.

== Province of Aix ==
- Archdiocese of Aix = Bouches-du-Rhône, minus the arrondissement of Marseille
- Diocese of Ajaccio = Haute-Corse and Corse-du-Sud
- Diocese of Digne = Alpes-de-Haute-Provence
- Diocese of Fréjus = Var
- Diocese of Gap = Hautes-Alpes
- Diocese of Nice = Alpes-Maritimes

== Province of Albi ==
- Archdiocese of Albi = Tarn
- Diocese of Cahors = Lot
- Diocese of Mende = Lozère
- Diocese of Perpignan = Pyrénées-Orientales
- Diocese of Rodez = Aveyron

== Province of Auch ==
- Archdiocese of Auch = Gers
- Diocese of Aire-et-Dax = Landes
- Diocese of Bayonne = Pyrénées-Atlantiques
- Diocese of Tarbes, renamed as Diocese of Tarbes-et-Lourdes in 1912 = Hautes-Pyrénées

== Province of Avignon ==
- Archdiocese of Avignon = Vaucluse
- Diocese of Montpellier = Hérault
- Diocese of Nîmes = Gard
- Diocese of Valence = Drôme
- Diocese of Viviers = Ardèche

== Province of Besançon ==
- Archdiocese of Besançon = originally Doubs
  - Diocese of Belfort-Montbéliard, detached from Besançon in 1979 = Territoire de Belfort and arrondissement of Montbéliard in the département of the Doubs
- Diocese of Nancy = originally Meurthe; after 1871, Meurthe-et-Moselle
- Diocese of Saint-Claude = Jura
- Diocese of Saint-Dié = Vosges
- Diocese of Verdun = Meuse

== Province of Bordeaux ==
- Archdiocese of Bordeaux = Gironde
- Diocese of Agen = Lot-et-Garonne
- Diocese of Angoulême = Charente
- Diocese of La Rochelle = Charente-Maritime
- Diocese of Luçon = Vendée
- Diocese of Périgueux = Dordogne
- Diocese of Poitiers = Vienne and Deux-Sèvres

== Province of Bourges ==
- Archdiocese of Bourges = Cher and Indre
- Diocese of Blois = Loir-et-Cher
- Diocese of Chartres = Eure-et-Loir
- Diocese of Clermont = Puy-de-Dôme
- Diocese of Le Puy-en-Velay = Haute-Loire
- Diocese of Limoges = Haute-Vienne and Creuse
- Diocese of Orléans = Loiret
- Diocese of Saint-Flour = Cantal
- Diocese of Tulle = Corrèze

== Province of Cambrai ==
- Archdiocese of Cambrai = originally Nord
  - Diocese of Lille, detached from Cambrai in 1913 = arrondissements of Lille and Dunkerque
- Diocese of Arras = Pas-de-Calais

== Province of Chambéry ==
- Archdiocese of Chambéry, Maurienne, and Tarentaise = Savoie
- Diocese of Annecy = Haute-Savoie

== Province of Lyon ==
- Archdiocese of Lyon = originally Rhône and Loire
  - Diocese of Saint-Étienne, detached from Lyon in 1970 = Loire, minus the arrondissement of Roanne
- Diocese of Autun = Saône-et-Loire
- Diocese of Belley, renamed as Belley-Ars in 1888 = Ain
- Diocese of Dijon = Côte-d'Or
- Diocese of Grenoble = Isère
- Diocese of Langres = Haute-Marne

== Province of Paris ==
- Archdiocese of Paris = Originally, département of the Seine, now only the City-département of Paris
  - Diocese of Créteil, detached from Paris in 1966 = Val-de-Marne
  - Diocese of Nanterre, detached from Paris in 1966 = Hauts-de-Seine
  - Diocese of Saint-Denis-en-France, detached from Paris in 1966 = Seine-Saint-Denis
- Diocese of Versailles = Originally, Seine-et-Oise, now only the smaller department Yvelines
  - Diocese of Évry–Corbeil-Essonnes, detached from Versailles in 1965 = Essonne
  - Diocese of Pontoise, detached from Versailles in 1966 = Val-d'Oise
- Diocese of Meaux = Seine-et-Marne

Before the establishment of the new dioceses in 1966, the dioceses of Blois, Chartres and Orléans were suffragans of Paris, and only then assigned to the province of Bourges as listed above.

== Province of Reims ==
- Archdiocese of Reims = département of the Ardennes and arrondissement of Reims in the département of the Marne
- Diocese of Amiens = Somme
- Diocese of Beauvais = Oise
- Diocese of Châlons-en-Champagne = Marne, minus the arrondissement of Reims
- Diocese of Soissons = Aisne

== Province of Rennes ==
(detached from Tours in 1859)

- Archdiocese of Rennes = Ille-et-Vilaine
- Diocese of Quimper = Finistère
- Diocese of Saint-Brieuc = Côtes-d'Armor
- Diocese of Vannes = Morbihan

== Province of Rouen ==
- Archdiocese of Rouen = originally the whole of Seine-Maritime
  - Diocese of Le Havre, detached from Rouen in 1974 = arrondissement of Le Havre in Seine-Maritime
- Diocese of Bayeux and Lisieux = Calvados
- Diocese of Coutances and Avranches = Manche
- Diocese of Évreux = Eure
- Diocese of Sées = Orne

== Province of Sens ==
- Archdiocese of Sens and Auxerre = Yonne
- Diocese of Moulins = Allier
- Diocese of Nevers = Nièvre
- Diocese of Troyes = Aube

== Province of Toulouse ==
- Archdiocese of Toulouse = Haute-Garonne
- Diocese of Montauban = Tarn-et-Garonne
- Diocese of Pamiers = Ariège
- Diocese of Carcassonne = Aude

== Province of Tours ==
- Metropolitan Archdiocese of Tours = Indre-et-Loire
- Diocese of Angers = Maine-et-Loire
- Diocese of Le Mans = originally Sarthe and Mayenne
  - Diocese of Laval, detached from Le Mans in 1855 = Mayenne
- Diocese of Nantes = Loire-Atlantique

== Under the direct authority of the Holy See ==
- Diocese of Marseille = arrondissement of Marseille in the Bouches-du-Rhône département
- Diocese of Metz = Moselle
- Diocese of Strasbourg = Bas-Rhin and Haut-Rhin (elevated to archdiocese in 1988)

The Concordat of 1801 had made Metz and Strasbourg (historically, suffragans of the then-archdioceses Trier and Mainz respectively) part of the province of Besançon. They were given exempt status after the annexation of their territories by Germany in 1871, but not reattached to Besançon after they were regained by France in 1918.

== Overseas ecclesiastical provinces ==
=== Antilles-Guyane ===
(province created in 1867)

- Archdiocese of Fort-de-France and Saint-Pierre, created in 1850 = Martinique
- Diocese of Basse-Terre and Pointe-à-Pitre, created in 1850 = Guadeloupe
- Diocese of Cayenne, created in 1956 = French Guiana

=== Under the direct authority of the Holy See ===
- Saint-Denis-de-la-Réunion, created in 1850 = Réunion

=== Papeete ===
(province created in 1966)

- Archdiocese of Papeete, created in 1966 = French Polynesia, minus the Marquesas Islands
- Diocese of Taiohae o Tefenuaenata, created in 1966 = Marquesas Islands

=== Nouméa ===
(province created in 1966)

- Archdiocese of Nouméa, created in 1966 = New Caledonia
- Diocese of Wallis-et-Futuna, created in 1966 = Wallis-et-Futuna
