= List of Catholic dioceses in France =

The Catholic Church in France mainly comprises a Metropolitan Latin Church hierarchy, joint in a national episcopal conference, consisting of

- fifteen ecclesiastical provinces, each under a Metropolitan Archdiocese (15)
  - with a total of 80 suffragans: seven non-Metropolitan Archdioceses, 72 bishoprics and a Territorial Prelature
- two exempt non-Metropolitan Archdioceses
- the (exempt) Military Ordinariate.

Furthermore, it has four exempt Eastern Catholic jurisdictions : three rite-specific (of which two are transnational) and a national Ordinariate for the Faithful of Eastern Rite for all others without rite-proper Ordinary.

The French overseas departments and territories, although administratively and constitutionally part of the French republic, are not part of the French church under canon law but exempt and/or part of an episcopal conference in their respective continent.

There is also an Apostolic Nunciature (as papal diplomatic representation at embassy-level) to France in the national capital Paris. the country also hosts three multilateral Holy See Representations: to the United Nations Educational, Scientific and Cultural Organization (UNESCO), to the Council of Europe in Strasburg and to the International Commission on Civil Status (ICCS).

The following contains the list of the French Catholic Roman Catholic dioceses of France as since 2002. See also the List of Ancien Régime dioceses of France and the List of French dioceses in the 19th and 20th century for information prior to 2002.

Dioceses of metropolitan France. Provinces are demarcated by bold lines and their sees (Metropolitan archdioceses) written in bold letters.

Pope John Paul II completely redrew the map of French ecclesiastical provinces in December 2002, in order to coincide more closely with the map of French administrative regions, but losing in several instances remaining boundaries surviving from late Roman times. This meant the creation of a few new Metropolitan archbishoprics and ecclesiastical provinces. This also entailed, for several archbishoprics, the loss of their metropolitan status (symbolised by the wearing of the pallium): their bishops nevertheless retained the title of archbishop.

As a result of history, many former episcopal sees were united, mainly as a consequence of the French Revolution; hence many dioceses bear the names of several cities, in which case, only the first one is the cathedral see where the bishop still actually resides.

In France, most dioceses coincide with a department of France, but there are a few exceptions, where some arrondissements are attached to a diocese outside the department, or form a separate diocese within the department (this happens mainly in departments with numerous populations, such as Nord or Bouches-du-Rhône). Along with the list of the new ecclesiastical provinces and their suffragan dioceses, this list also gives the equivalent of the diocesan jurisdiction in departmental terms.

== Current European French Dioceses ==
=== Exempt, i.e. directly subject to the Holy See ===
==== Exempt Latin ====
- Military Ordinariate of France
- Archdiocese of Strasbourg (Bas-Rhin and Haut-Rhin)
- Diocese of Metz (Moselle)

==== Eastern Catholic (exempt) jurisdictions ====
- Ordinariate for Eastern Catholics in France, vested in the Metropolitan Archbishop of capital Paris.
- Armenian Catholic Eparchy of Sainte-Croix-de-Paris, Armenian Rite, with Cathédrale Sainte-Croix de Paris des Arméniens in Paris, for France, immediately subject to the Patriarch of Cilicia, but not part of his province.
- Maronite Eparchy of Notre-Dame du Liban de Paris, Antiochian Rite and West Syriac Rite, with Our Lady of Lebanon of Paris Cathedral, immediately subject to the Maronite Patriarchs of Antioch, but not part of his province; also Apostolic Visitor in Western and Northern Europe of the Maronites.
- Ukrainian Catholic Eparchy of Saint Vladimir the Great of Paris, Byzantine Rite, with St. Vladimir's Cathedral, Paris, directly subject to the Ukrainian Catholic Major Archeparchy of Kyiv–Galicia, and covers for France, Belgium, Luxembourg, the Netherlands and Switzerland.

=== Episcopal Conference of ('Metropolitan', European) France ===
==== Ecclesiastical Province of Besançon ====
(Franche-Comté and part of Lorraine)

- Metropolitan Archdiocese of Besançon (Haute-Saône and Doubs, minus Montbéliard arrondissement)
  - Diocese of Belfort–Montbéliard (Territoire de Belfort and Montbéliard arrondissement)
  - Diocese of Nancy and Toul (Meurthe-et-Moselle)
  - Diocese of Saint-Claude (Jura)
  - Diocese of Saint-Dié (Vosges)
  - Diocese of Verdun (Meuse)

==== Ecclesiastical Province of Bordeaux ====
(Aquitaine)

- Metropolitan Archdiocese of Bordeaux (Gironde)
  - Diocese of Agen (Lot-et-Garonne)
  - Diocese of Aire and Dax (Landes)
  - Diocese of Bayonne, Lescar, and Oloron (Pyrénées-Atlantiques)
  - Diocese of Périgueux and Sarlat (Dordogne)

==== Ecclesiastical Province of Clermont ====
(Auvergne)

- Metropolitan Archdiocese of Clermont (Puy-de-Dôme — New archdiocese (2002))
  - Diocese of Le Puy-en-Velay (Haute-Loire)
  - Diocese of Moulins (Allier)
  - Diocese of Saint-Flour (Cantal)

==== Ecclesiastical Province of Dijon ====
(Burgundy)

- Metropolitan Archdiocese of Dijon (Côte-d'Or — New archdiocese (2002))
  - Archdiocese of Sens and Auxerre (Yonne)
  - Diocese of Autun (Saône-et-Loire)
  - Diocese of Nevers (Nièvre)
  - Territorial Prelature of the Mission de France at Pontigny (Pontigny)

==== Ecclesiastical Province of Lille ====
(Nord-Pas-de-Calais)

- Metropolitan Archdiocese of Lille (Nord, arrondissements of Dunkerque and Lille — New archdiocese (2008))
  - Archdiocese of Cambrai (Nord, arrondissements of Avesnes-sur-Helpe, Cambrai, Douai, Valenciennes)
  - Diocese of Arras (Pas-de-Calais)

==== Ecclesiastical Province of Lyon ====
(Rhône-Alpes)

- Metropolitan Archdiocese of Lyon (Rhône and the arrondissement of Roanne in the département of the Loire)
  - Archdiocese of Chambéry, Saint-Jean-de-Maurienne, and Tarentaise (Savoie)
  - Diocese of Annecy (Haute-Savoie)
  - Diocese of Belley–Ars (Ain)
  - Diocese of Grenoble–Vienne-les-Allobroges (Isère)
  - Diocese of Saint-Étienne (Loire, minus the arrondissement of Roanne)
  - Diocese of Valence (Drôme)
  - Diocese of Viviers (Ardèche)

==== Ecclesiastical Province of Marseille ====
(Provence-Alpes-Côte-d'Azur and Corsica)

- Metropolitan Archdiocese of Marseille (Bouches-du-Rhône, arrondissement of Marseille — New archdiocese (2002))
  - Archdiocese of Aix-en-Provence and Arles (Bouches-du-Rhône, minus the arrondissement of Marseille (Arles is in the Bouches-du-Rhône))
  - Archdiocese of Avignon (Vaucluse)
  - Diocese of Ajaccio (Upper Corsica and South Corsica)
  - Diocese of Digne (Alpes-de-Haute-Provence)
  - Diocese of Fréjus–Toulon (Var)
  - Diocese of Gap and Embrun (Hautes-Alpes)
  - Diocese of Nice (Alpes-Maritimes)

==== Ecclesiastical Province of Montpellier ====
(Languedoc-Roussillon)

- Metropolitan Archdiocese of Montpellier (Hérault — New archdiocese (2002))
  - Diocese of Carcassonne and Narbonne (Aude)
  - Diocese of Mende (Lozère)
  - Diocese of Nîmes (Gard)
  - Diocese of Perpignan–Elne (Pyrénées-Orientales)

==== Ecclesiastical Province of Paris ====
(Ile-de-France)

- Metropolitan Archdiocese of Paris (City-département of Paris)
  - Diocese of Créteil (Val-de-Marne)
  - Diocese of Évry–Corbeil-Essonnes (Essonne)
  - Diocese of Meaux (Seine-et-Marne)
  - Diocese of Nanterre (Hauts-de-Seine)
  - Diocese of Pontoise (Val-d'Oise)
  - Diocese of Saint-Denis in France (Seine-Saint-Denis)
  - Diocese of Versailles (Yvelines)

==== Ecclesiastical Province of Poitiers ====
(Poitou-Charentes and Limousin)

- Metropolitan Archdiocese of Poitiers (Vienne and Deux-Sèvres — New archdiocese (2002))
  - Diocese of Angoulême (Charente)
  - Diocese of La Rochelle and Saintes (Charente-Maritime), also with jurisdiction at the French overseas collectivity Saint-Pierre and Miquelon
  - Diocese of Limoges (Haute-Vienne and Creuse)
  - Diocese of Tulle (Corrèze)

==== Ecclesiastical Province of Reims ====
(Champagne-Ardenne and Picardy)

- Metropolitan Archdiocese of Reims (arrondissement of Reims in the Marne and département of the Ardennes)
  - Diocese of Amiens (Somme)
  - Diocese of Beauvais, Noyon, and Senlis (Oise)
  - Diocese of Châlons (Marne, minus the arrondissement of Reims)
  - Diocese of Langres (Haute-Marne)
  - Diocese of Soissons, Laon, and Saint-Quentin (Aisne)
  - Diocese of Troyes (Aube)

==== Ecclesiastical Province of Rennes ====
(Brittany and Pays de la Loire)

- Metropolitan Archdiocese of Rennes, Dol, and Saint-Malo (Ille-et-Vilaine)
  - Diocese of Angers (Maine-et-Loire)
  - Diocese of Laval (Mayenne)
  - Diocese of Le Mans (Sarthe)
  - Diocese of Luçon (Vendée)
  - Diocese of Nantes (Loire-Atlantique)
  - Diocese of Quimper and Léon (Finistère)
  - Diocese of Saint-Brieuc and Tréguier (Côtes-d'Armor)
  - Diocese of Vannes (Morbihan)

==== Ecclesiastical Province of Rouen ====
(Upper and Lower Normandy)

- Metropolitan Archdiocese of Rouen (Seine-Maritime, minus the arrondissement of Le Havre)
  - Diocese of Bayeux and Lisieux (Calvados)
  - Diocese of Coutances (Manche)
  - Diocese of Évreux (Eure)
  - Diocese of Le Havre (arrondissement of Le Havre in Seine-Maritime)
  - Diocese of Sées (Orne)

==== Eccleasiastical Province of Toulouse ====
(Midi-Pyrénées)

- Metropolitan Archdiocese of Toulouse (Haute-Garonne )
  - Archdiocese of Albi (Tarn)
  - Archdiocese of Auch (Gers)
  - Diocese of Cahors (Lot)
  - Diocese of Montauban (Tarn-et-Garonne)
  - Diocese of Pamiers (Ariège)
  - Diocese of Rodez (Aveyron)
  - Diocese of Tarbes-et-Lourdes (Hautes-Pyrénées)

==== Eccleasiastical Province of Tours ====
(Centre-Val de Loire)

- Metropolitan Archdiocese of Tours (Indre-et-Loire)
  - Archdiocese of Bourges (Cher and Indre)
  - Diocese of Blois (Loir-et-Cher)
  - Diocese of Chartres (Eure-et-Loir)
  - Diocese of Orléans (Loiret)

== Defunct jurisdictions in European France ==
=== Titular sees ===
There were titular metropolitan sees that were both united with another diocese, such as the Archdiocese of Arles and the Archdiocese of Embrun.

There were also titular episcopal sees, 41 of which were united and 18 were not united with other dioceses, these included: Accia, Agde (united), Aléria, Alès (united), Alet, Apt, Arisitum, Auxerre (united), Avranches (united), Bazas (united), Béziers (united), Boulogne (united), Briançonnet, Carpentras, Castres (united), Cavaillon, Châlon-sur-Saône (united), Condom (united), Couserans (united), Die (united), Dol (united), Entrevaux, Laon (united), Lavaur (united), Lectoure (united), Léon (united), Lescar (united), Lisieux (united), Lodève (united), Lombez (united), Mâcon (united), Maillezais, Mariana en Corse, Mirepoix (united), Nebbio, Noyon (united), Oloron (united), Orange, Rieux (united), Riez (united), Sagone, Saint-Bertrand-de-Comminges (united), Saint-Malo (united), Saint-Omer (united), Saint-Papoul, Saint-Paul-Trois-Châteaux (united), Saint-Pons-de-Thomières (united), Saint-Quentin (united), Saintes (united), Sarlat (united), Senez, Senlis (united), Sisteron (united), Thérouanne, Toul (united), Tréguier (united), Uzès (united), Vabres (united), and Vaison.

There was the single titular abbacy of Cluny that became united with another diocese.

=== Other defunct French sees ===
There were other dioceses that no longer exist and were not united with current active dioceses, these included: Diocese of Aleth, Diocese of Antibes, Diocese of Bethléem à Clamecy (alias Panthenor), Diocese of Bourg-en-Bresse, Diocese of Cimiez, Diocese of Dax (Acqs), Archdiocese of Eauze (Elusa), Diocese of Grasse, Diocese of Javols, Diocese of Limoux, Archdiocese of Narbonne, Diocese of Rezé, Diocese of Saint-Jean-de-Maurienne, Diocese of Sospel, Archdiocese of Tarentaise, Diocese of Toulon, Diocese of Vence, Diocese of Vernay and the Archdiocese of Vienne.

== Overseas French dioceses ==
all Latin (in many cases, in a conference/province(s) with non-French, mainly Anglophone, dioceses)

=== Exempt, directly subject to the Holy See (Africa) ===
- Diocese of Saint-Denis de La Réunion (Réunion)

=== Episcopal Conference of the Antilles ===
==== Ecclesiastical Province of Martinique ====
(Martinique, Guadeloupe, French Guiana; exclusively Francophone)

- Metropolitan Archdiocese of Saint-Pierre and Fort-de-France (Martinique)
  - Diocese of Basse-Terre and Pointe-à-Pitre (Guadeloupe)
  - Diocese of Cayenne (French Guiana)

=== Episcopal Conference of the Pacific (Oceania) ===
==== Ecclesiastical Province of Papeete ====
- Metropolitan Archdiocese of Papeete (French Polynesia, minus the Marquesas Islands)
  - Taiohae o Tefenuaenata (Marquesas Islands)

==== Ecclesiastical Province of Nouméa ====
- Metropolitan Archdiocese of Nouméa (New Caledonia)
  - Diocese of Wallis et Futuna (Wallis and Futuna)
  - Diocese of Port-Vila, on and for Vanuatu (formerly the Anglo-French condominium New Hebrides)

== Gallery of Archdioceses ==
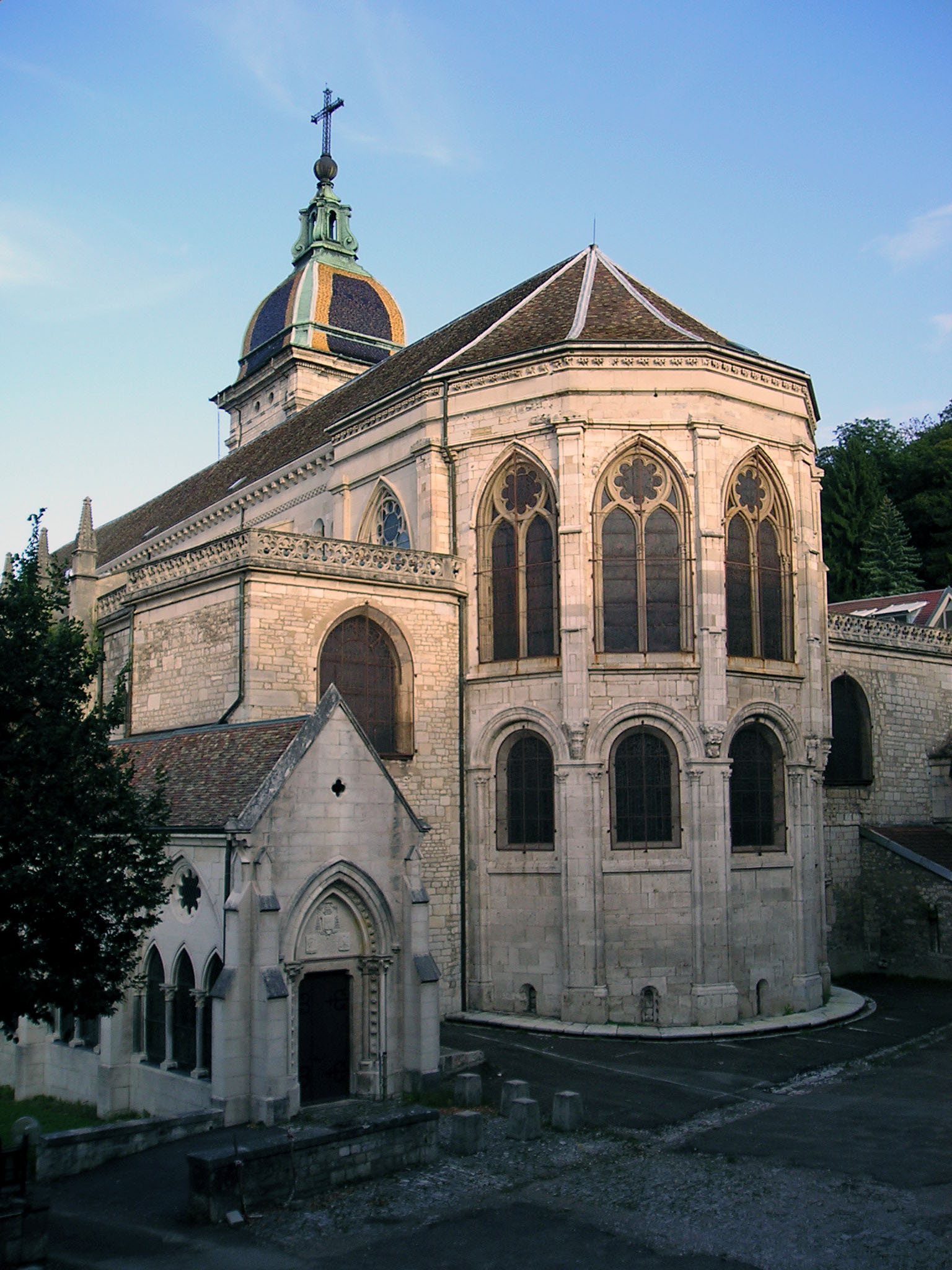
The seat of the Archdiocese of Besançon is Basilique-Cathédrale Saint-Jean l’évangéliste.

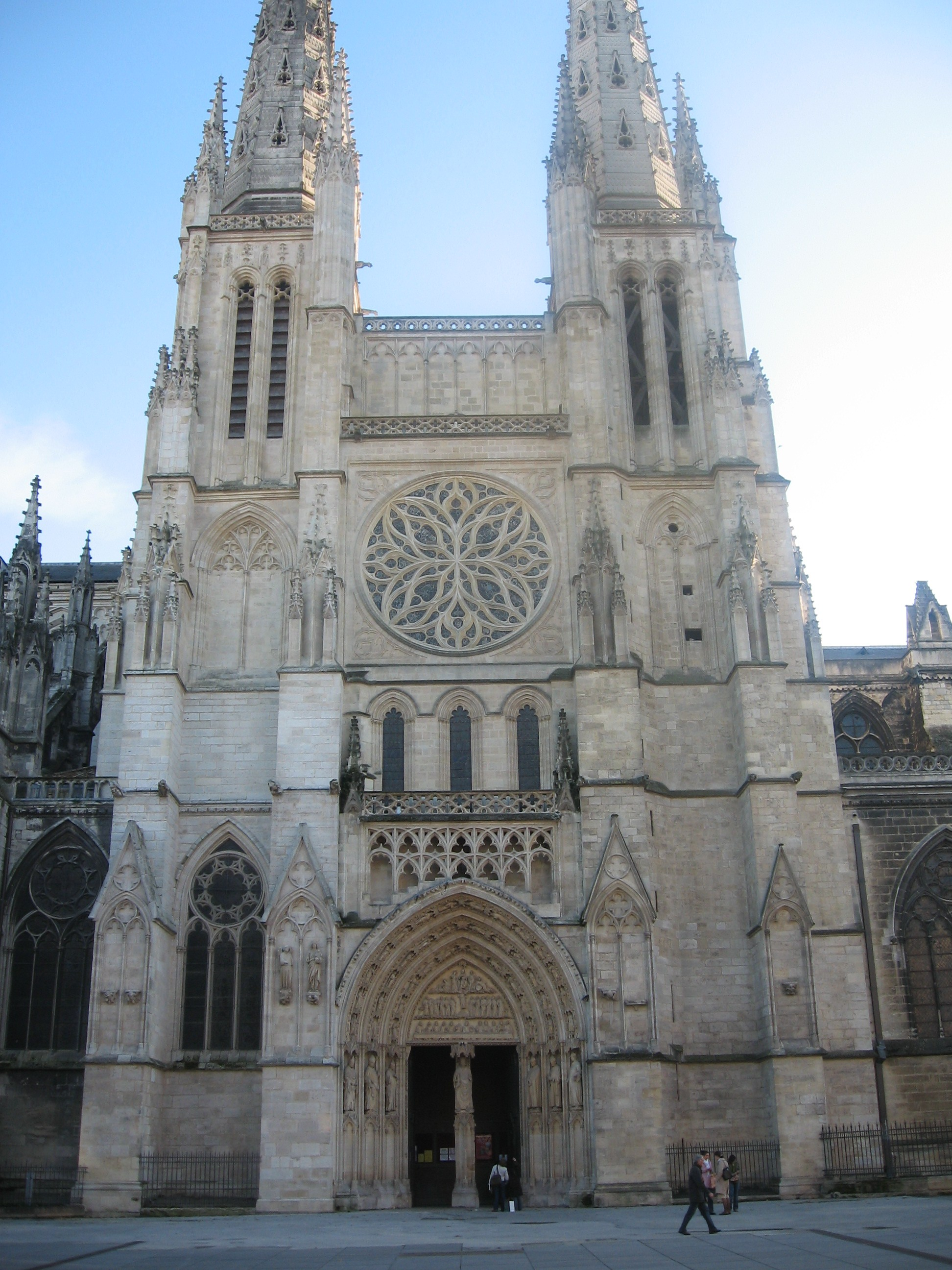
The seat of the Archdiocese of Bordeaux is Cathédrale Saint-André.

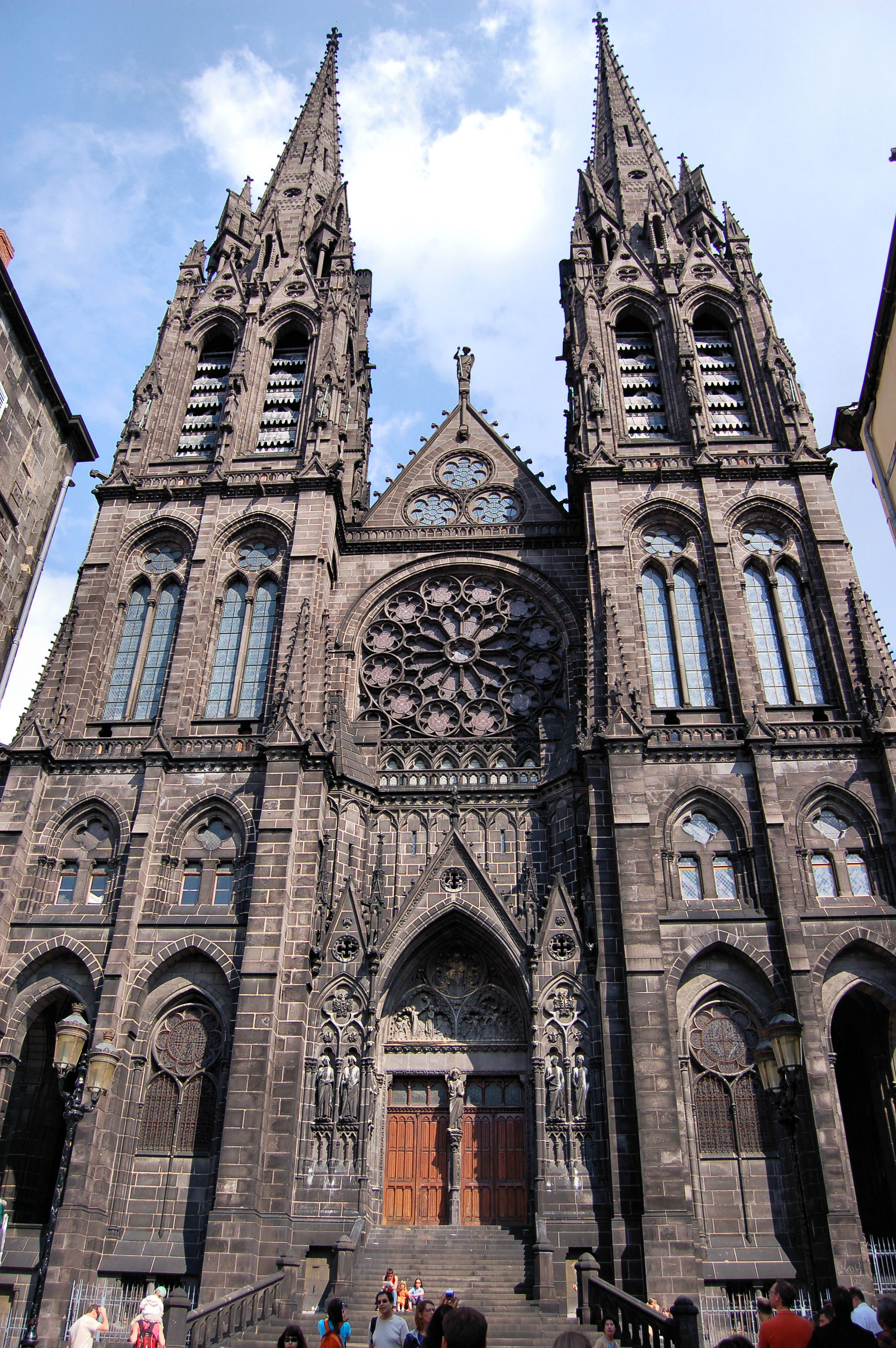
The seat of the Archdiocese of Clermont is Cathédrale Notre-Dame-de-l'Assomption.

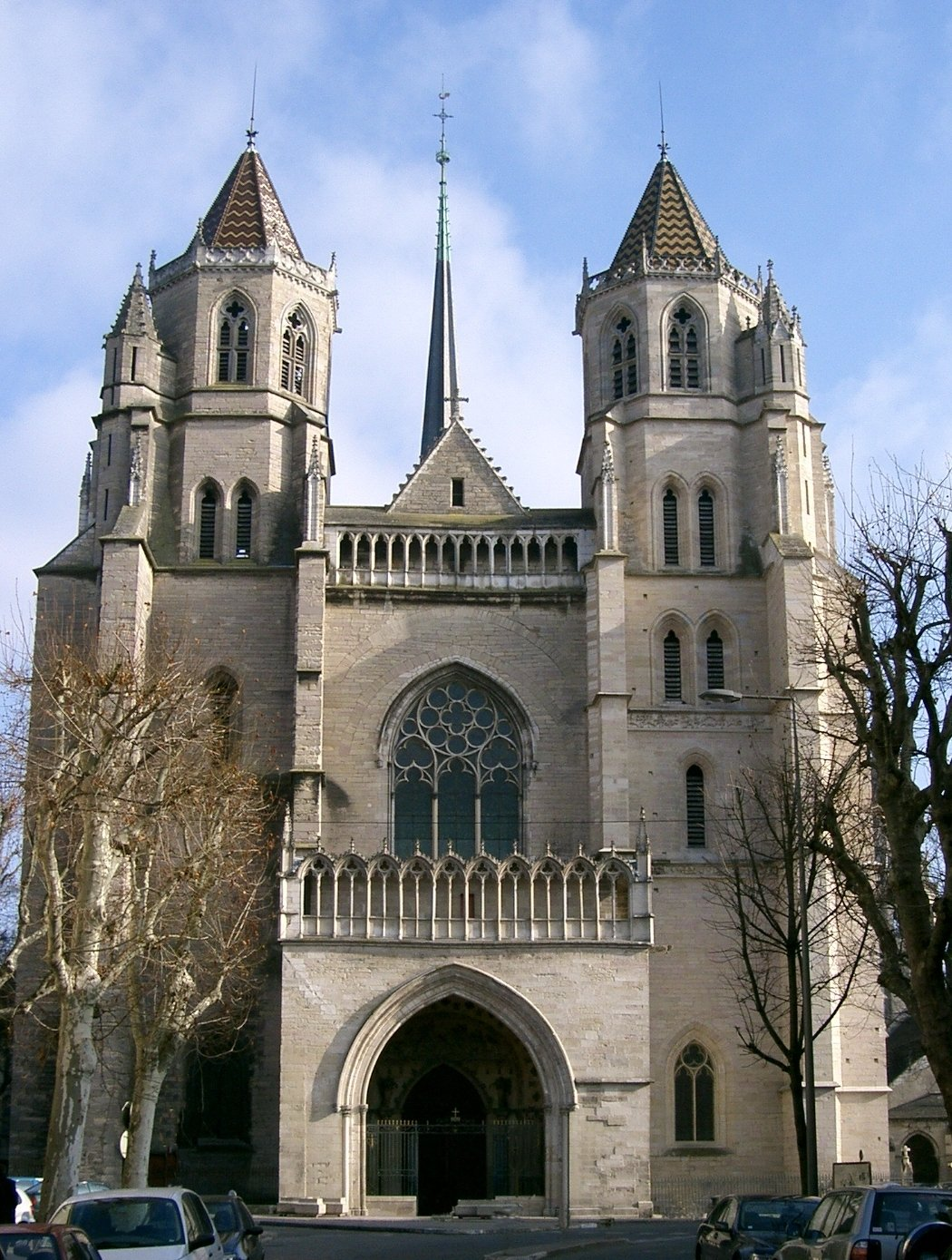
The seat of the Archdiocese of Dijon Cathedral is Cathédrale Saint-Bénigne.

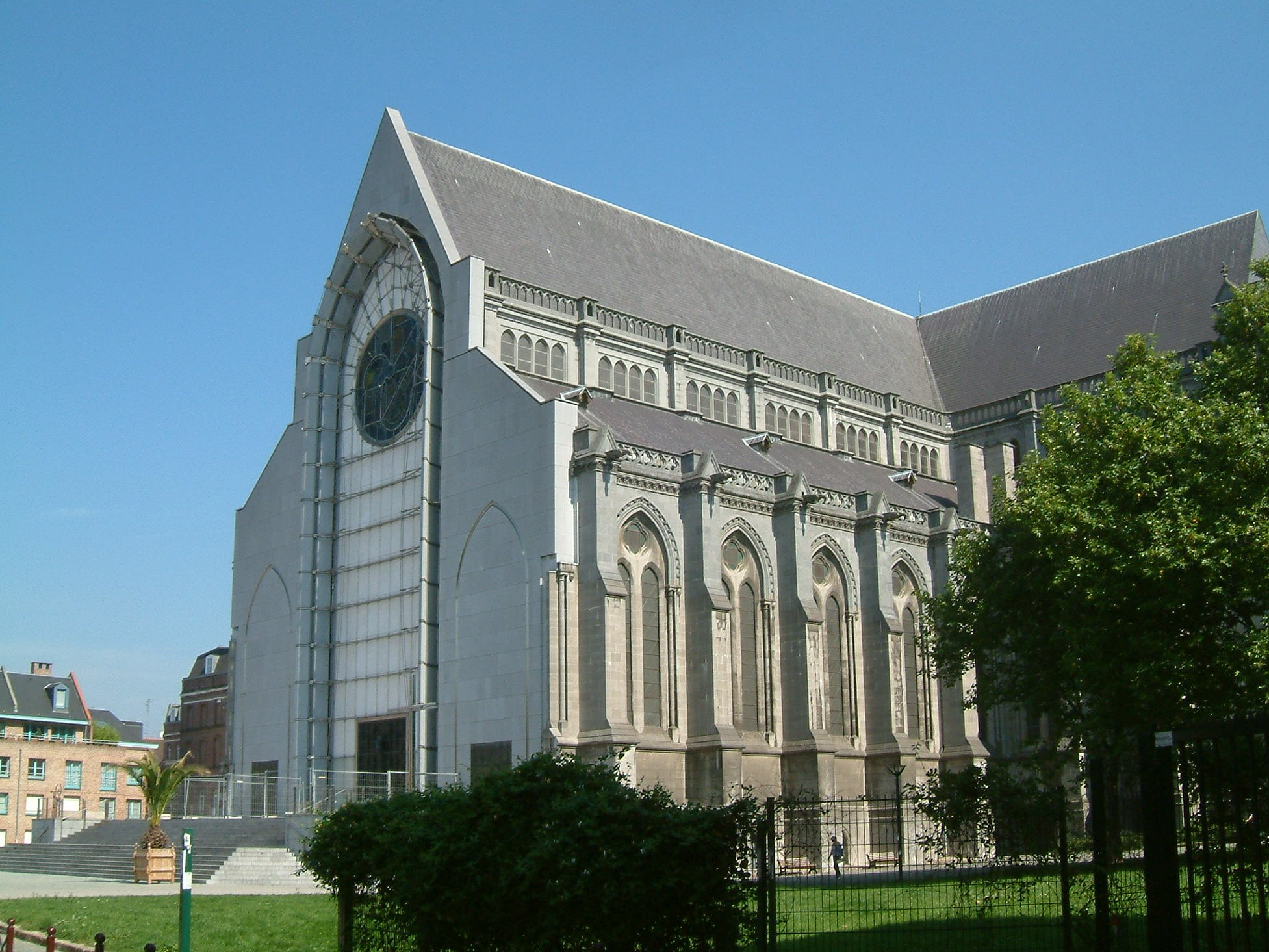
The seat of the Archdiocese of Lille is Basilique-cathédrale Notre-Dame-de-la-Treille.

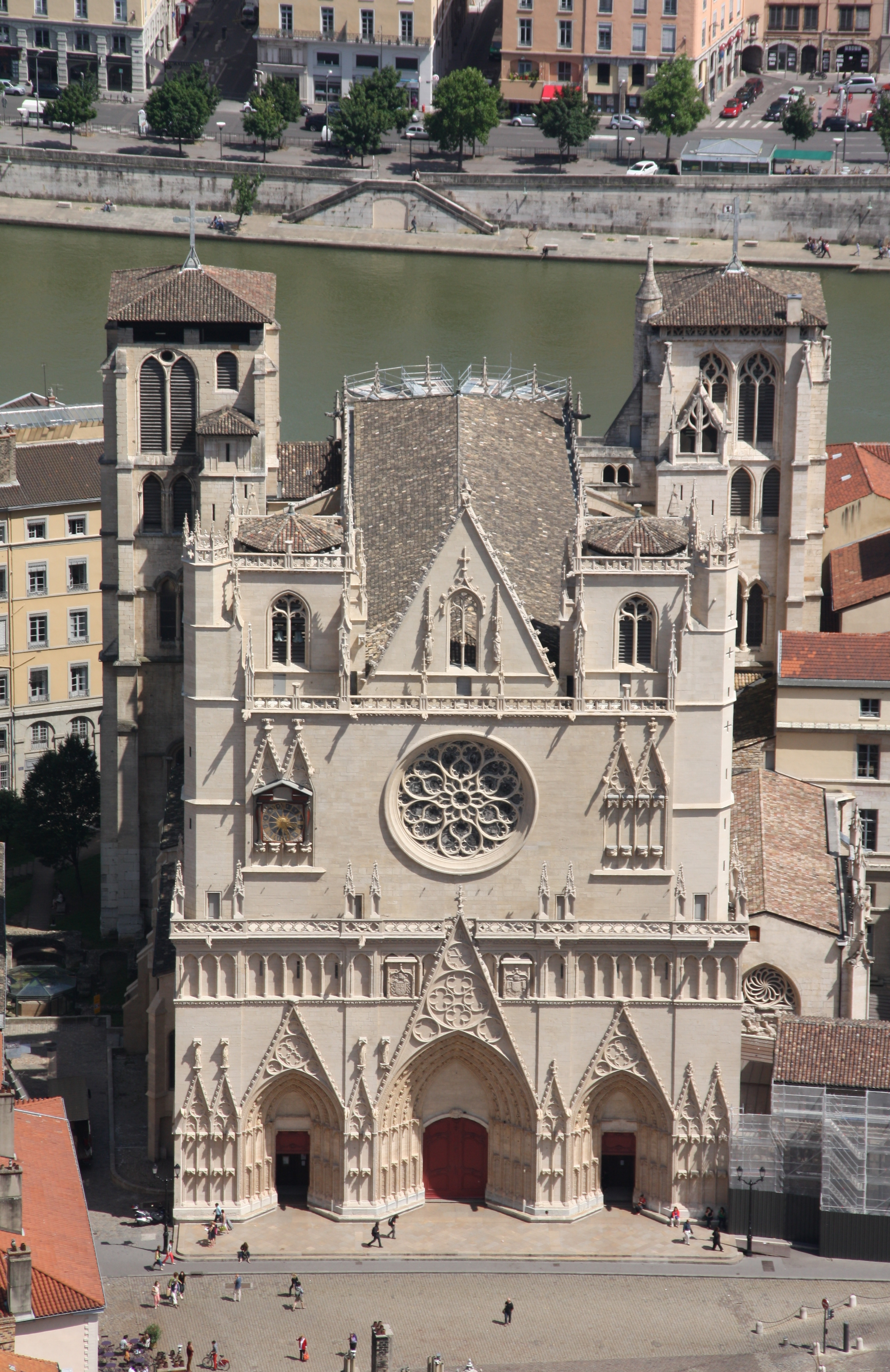
The seat of the Archdiocese of Lyon is Cathédrale Saint-Jean-Baptiste

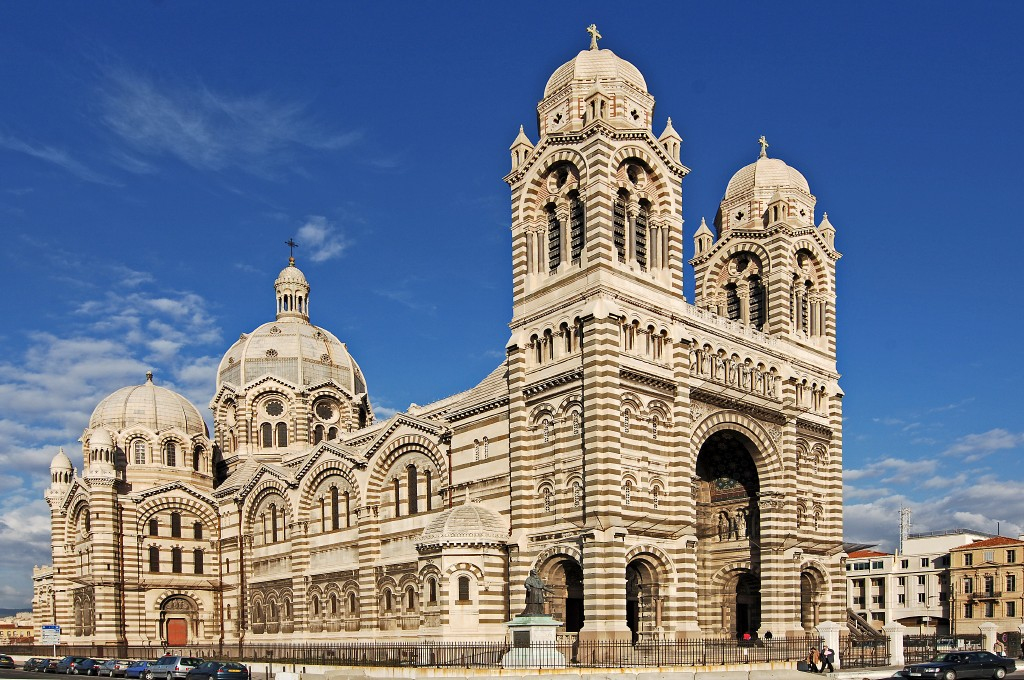
The seat of the Archdiocese of Marseille is Cathédrale Sainte-Marie-Majeure.

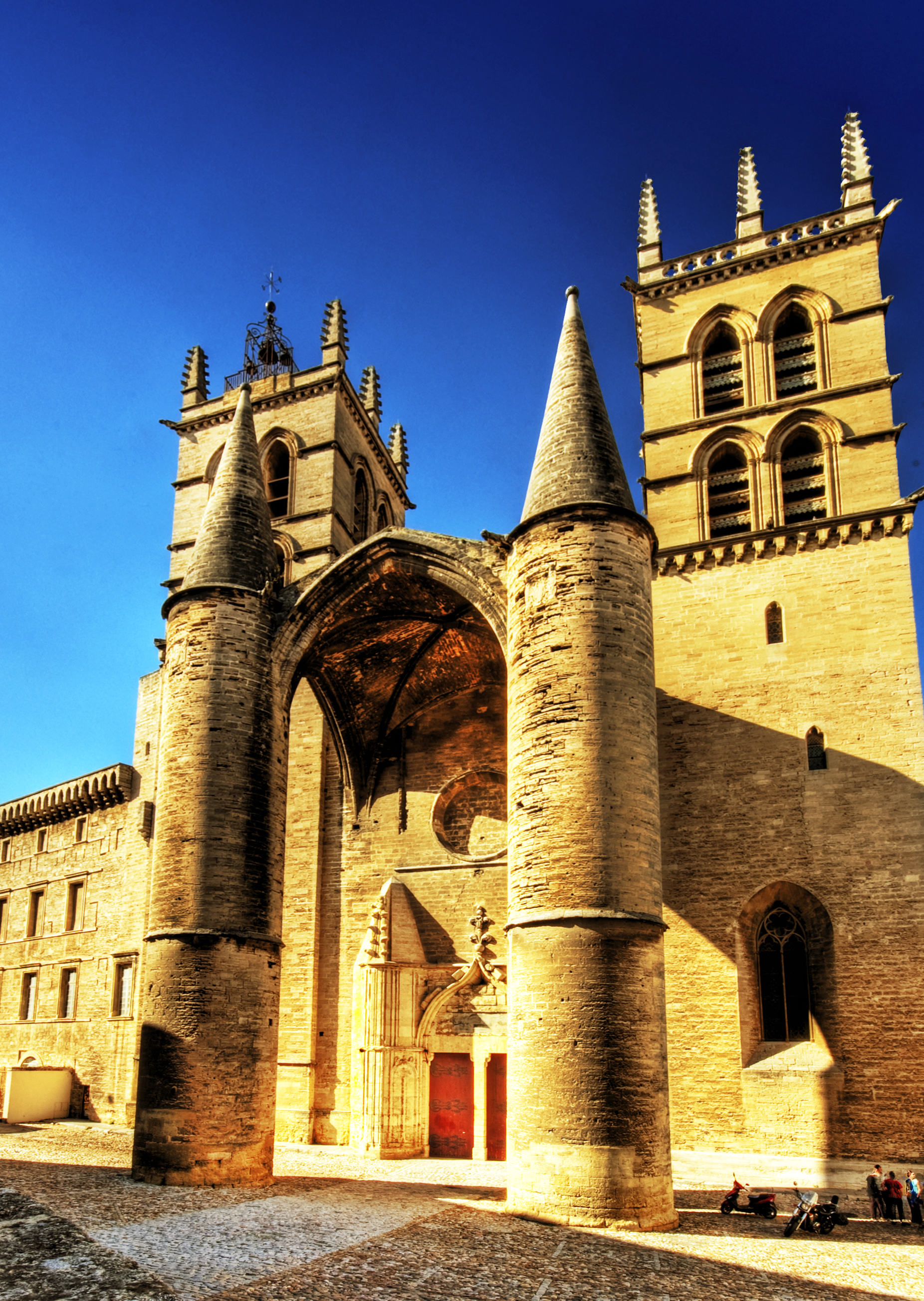
The seat of the Archdiocese of Montpellier is Cathédrale Saint-Pierre.

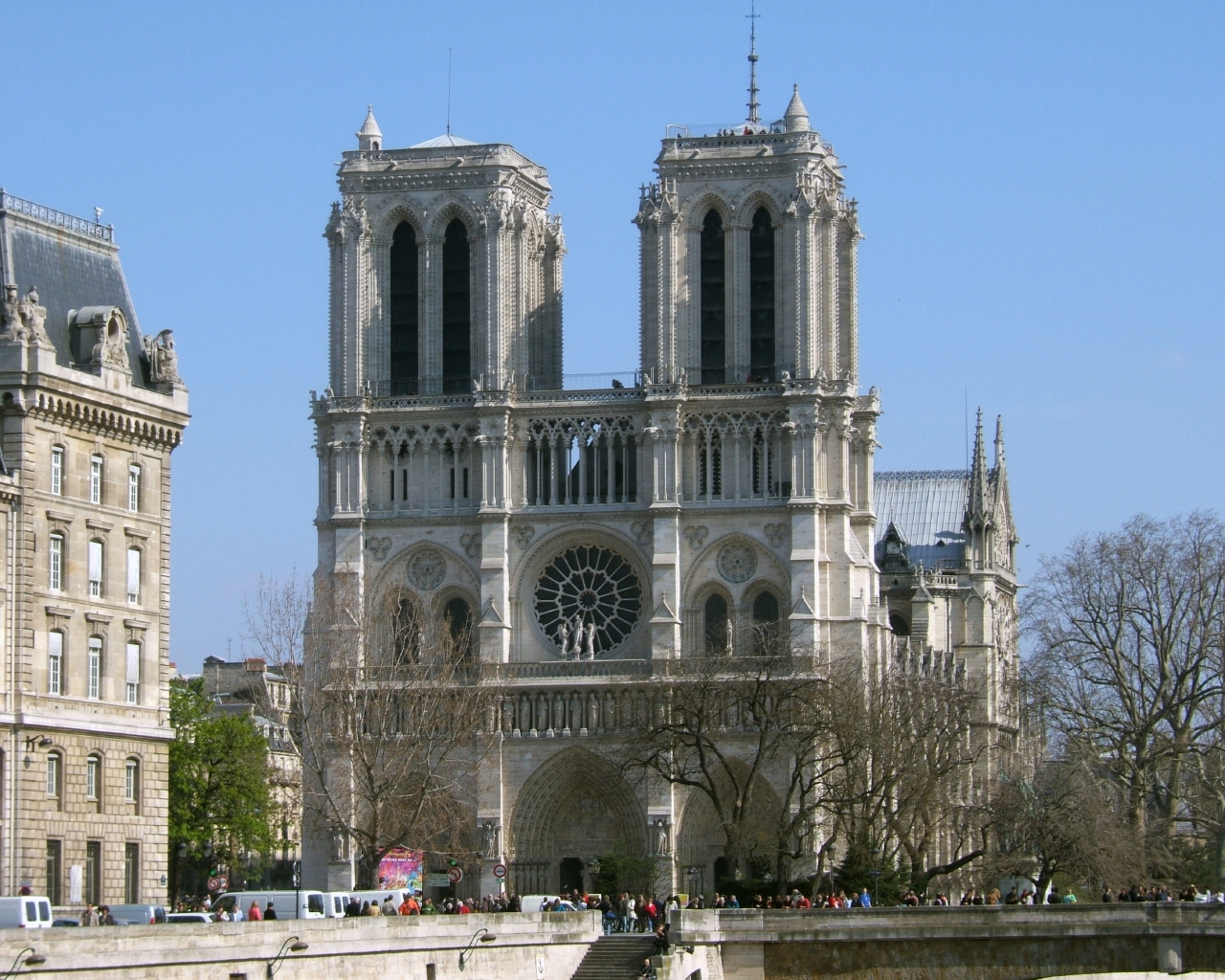
The seat of the Archdiocese of Paris is Notre Dame de Paris.

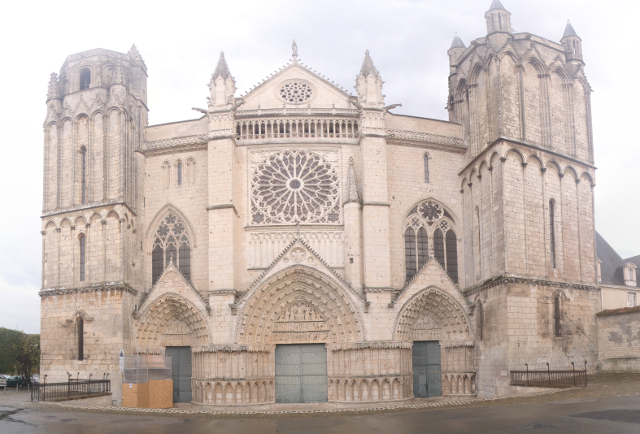
The seat of the Archdiocese of Poitiers is Cathédrale Saint-Pierre.

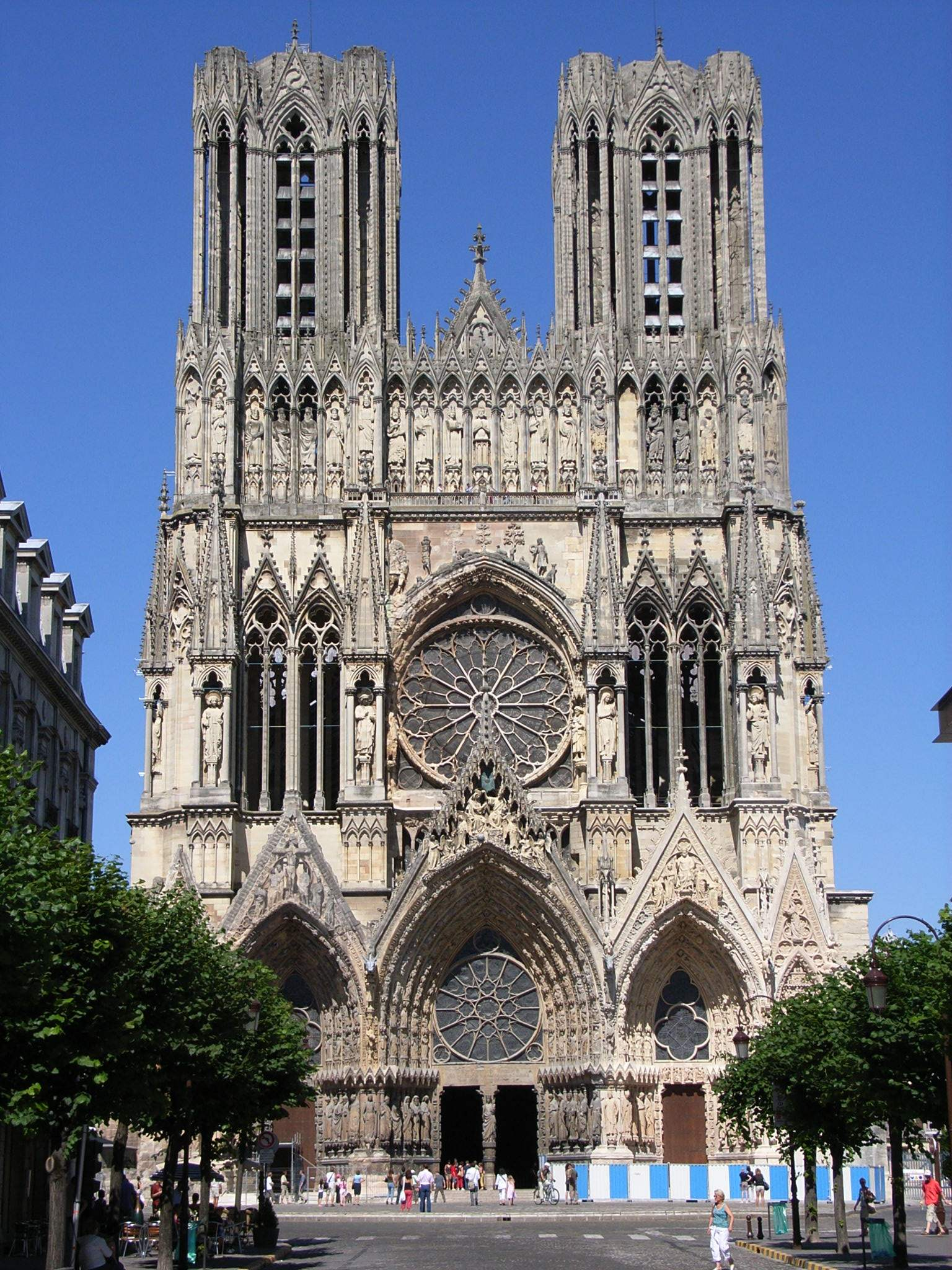
The seat of the Archdiocese of Reims is Notre-Dame de Reims.

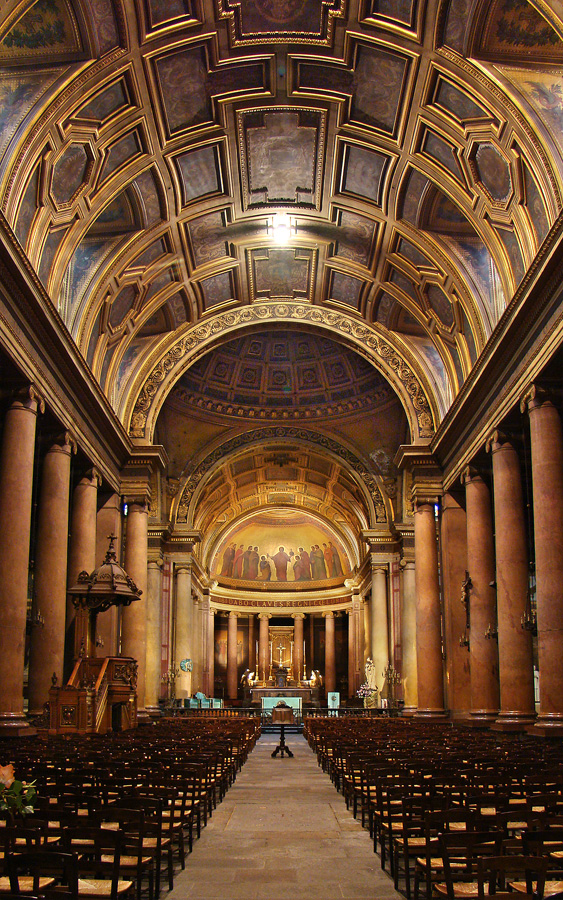
The seat of the Archdiocese of Rennes is Cathédrale Saint-Pierre.

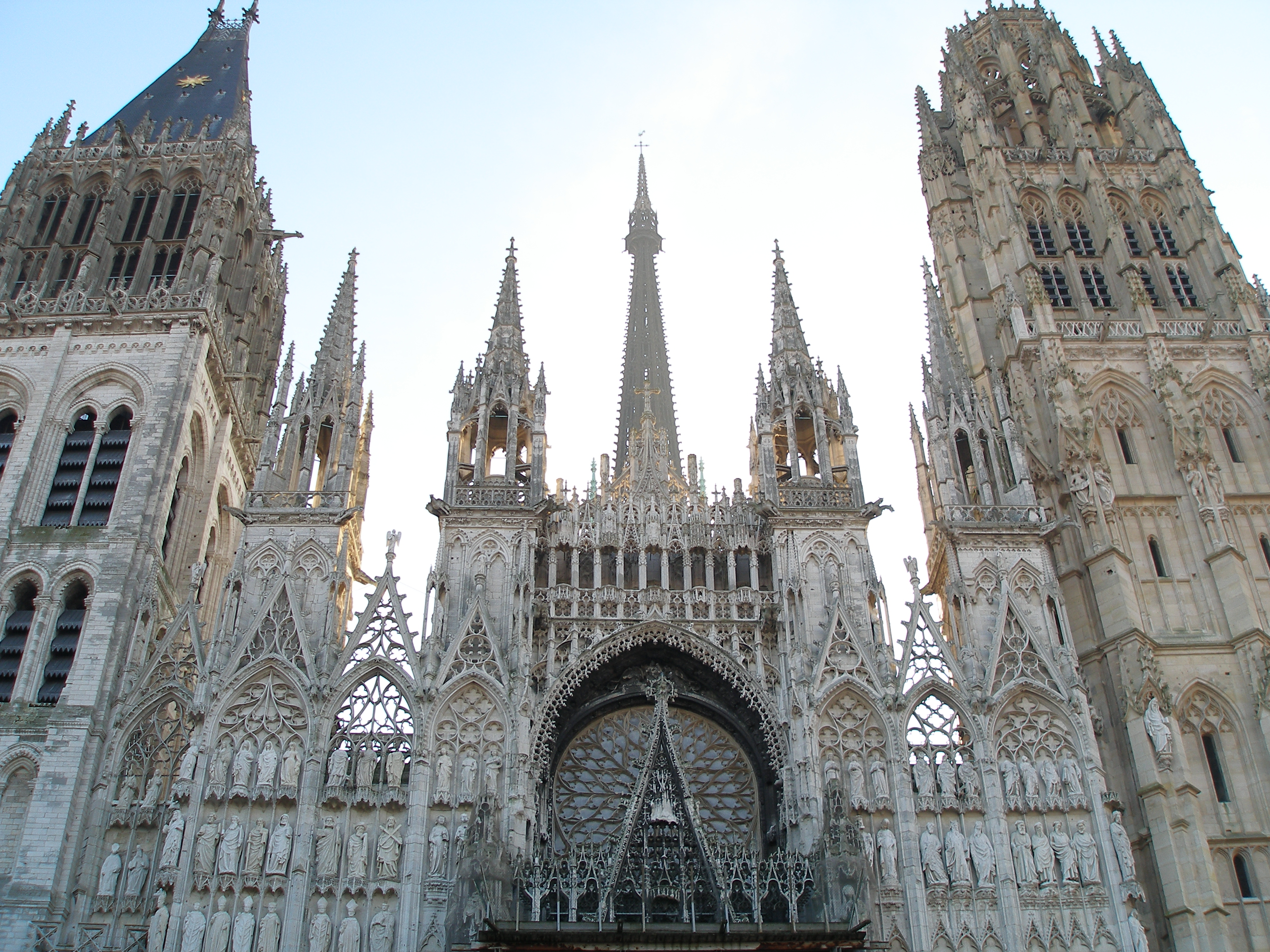
The seat of the Archdiocese of Rouen is Notre-Dame Cathedral of Rouen.

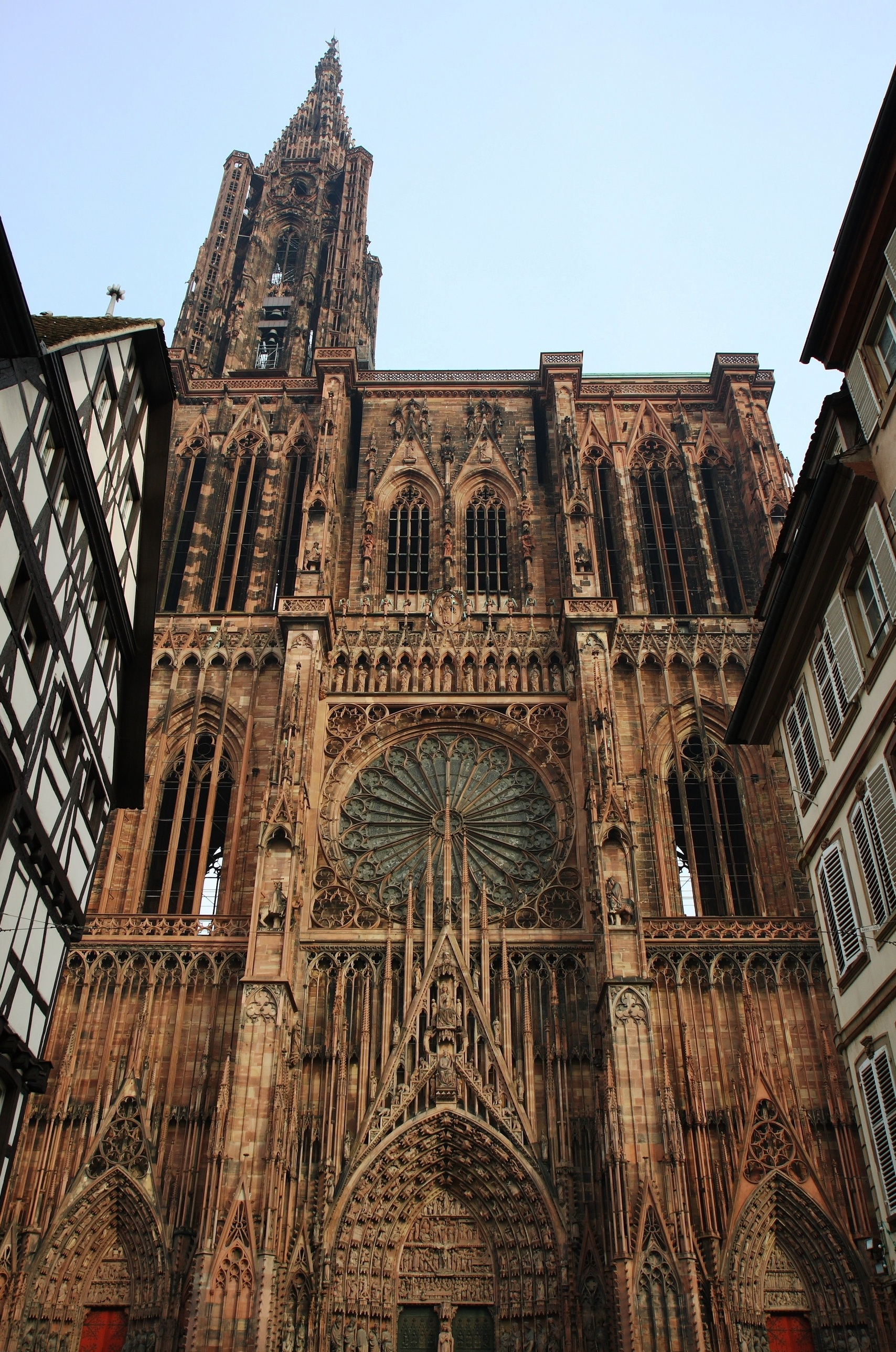
The seat of the Archdiocese of Strasbourg is Notre-Dame Cathedral of Strasbourg.

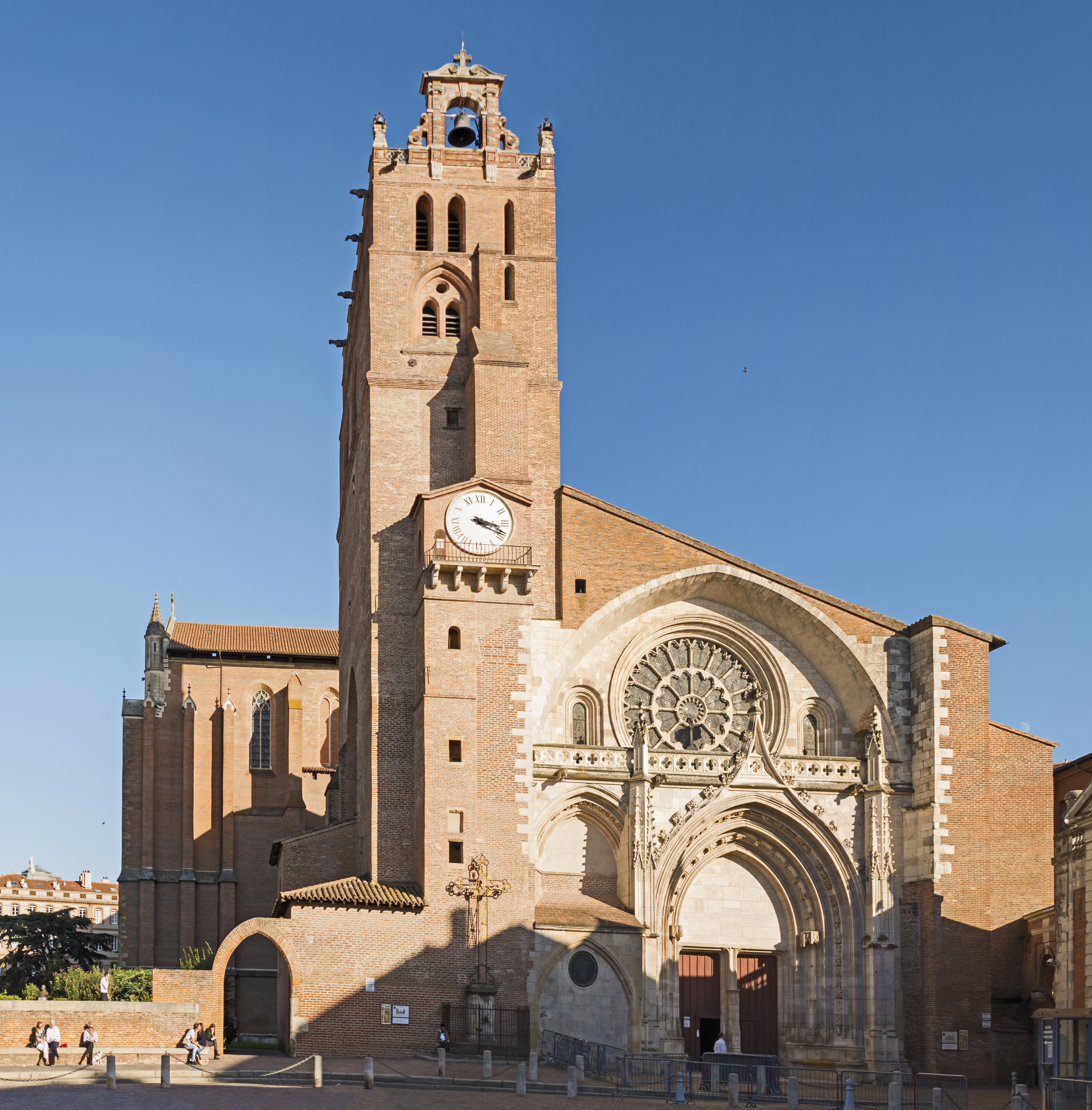
The seat of the Archdiocese of Toulouse is Cathédrale Saint-Étienne.

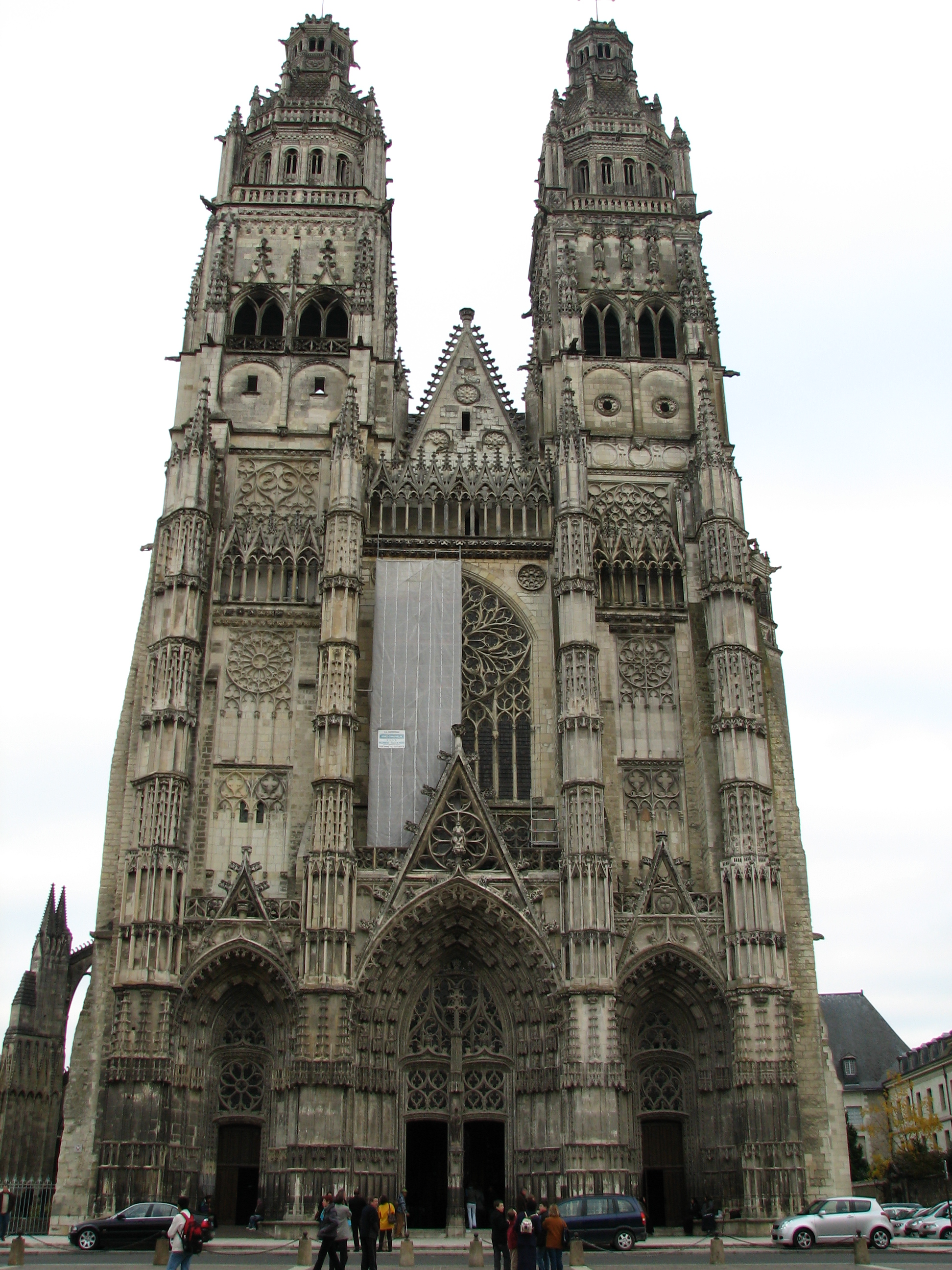
The seat of the Archdiocese of Tours is Cathédrale Saint-Gatien.

== See also ==
- List of Catholic dioceses (structured view)
- List of Catholic dioceses (alphabetical)
- List of Ancien Régime dioceses of France
- List of French dioceses in the 19th and 20th century
- Primate of Gaul
- Primate of Normandy

== Sources and external links ==
- GCatholic.org - data for all sections.
- Catholic-Hierarchy entry.
