= Pierre Jacques Joatton =

Pierre Jacques Joatton Ist. del Prado
- Bishop of Saint-Étienne
- Church: Catholic Church
- Diocese: Diocese of Saint-Étienne
- In office: 20 April 1988 – 28 June 2006
- Predecessor: Paul-Marie François Rousset
- Successor: Dominique Lebrun

Orders
- Ordination: 29 June 1957 by Pierre-Marie Gerlier
- Consecration: 26 June 1988 by Albert Decourtray

Personal details
- Born: Pierre Jacques Marie Joatton; 20 July 1930 Lyon, Rhône, France
- Died: 22 November 2013 (aged 83)

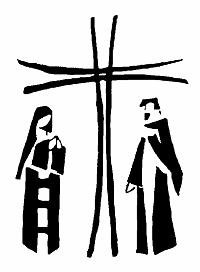
« Dans la foi de Marie et des Apôtres »

Pierre Jacques Joatton (20 July 1930 − 22 November 2013) was a French Roman Catholic bishop.

Ordained to the priesthood on 29 June 1957, Joatton was named bishop of the Roman Catholic Diocese of Saint-Étienne, France on 20 April 1988 and retired on 28 June 2006.
