= Saint-Étienne Cathedral =

Cathedral located in Loire, in France

Saint-Étienne Cathedral Cathédrale Saint-Charles-de-Borromé de Saint-Étienne
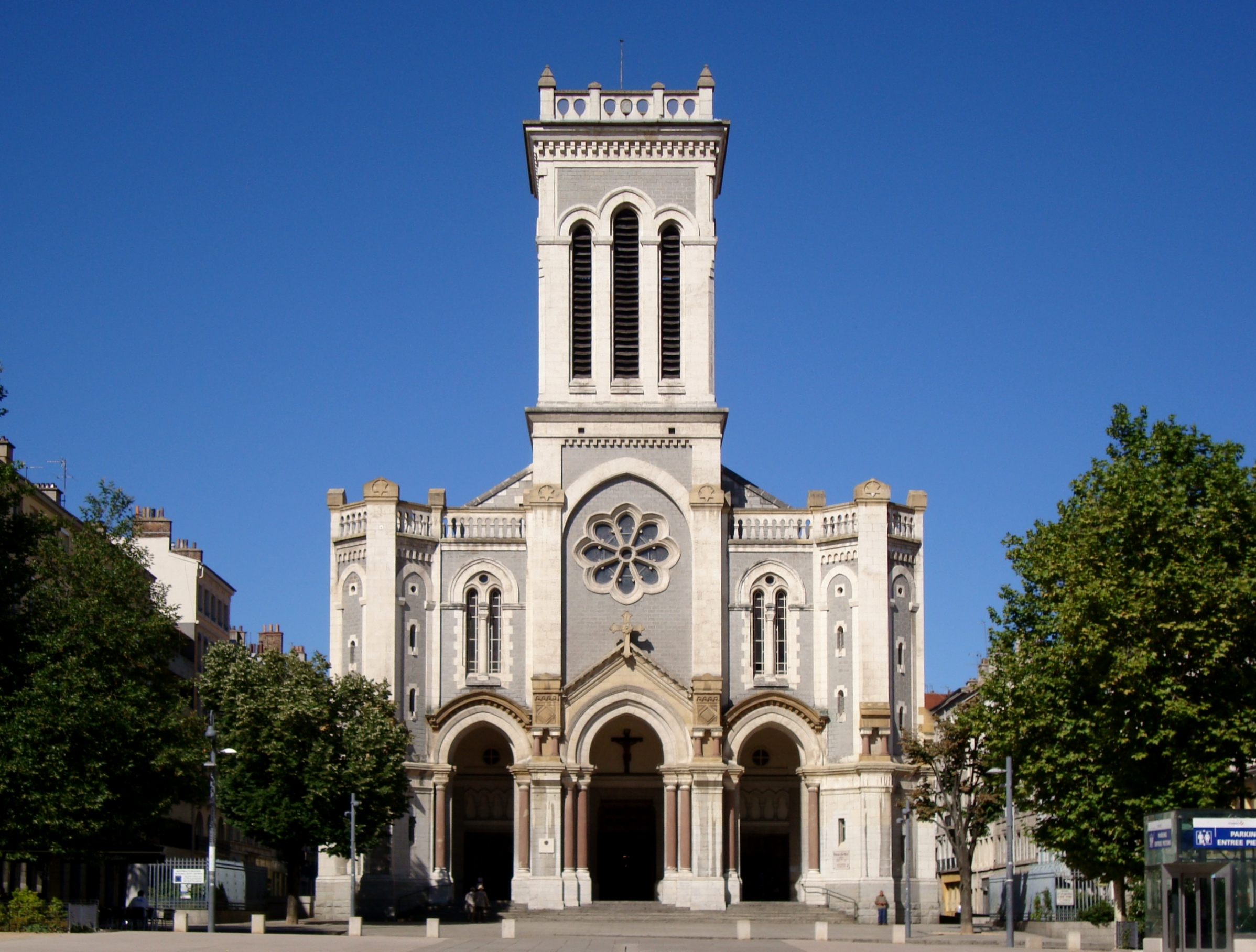
- West front of the cathedral

Religion
- Affiliation: Roman Catholic
- Ecclesiastical or organisational status: Cathedral
- Leadership: Bishop Dominique Lebrun
- Year consecrated: 1933

Location
- Location: Saint-Etienne, France
- Interactive map of Saint-Étienne Cathedral; Cathédrale Saint-Charles-de-Borromé de Saint-Étienne
- Coordinates: 45°26′27.7″N 4°23′4.4″E

Architecture
- Architects: Pierre Bossan, Adrien Rey, Francisque Dodat
- Type: Church
- Style: Neo-Gothic
- Groundbreaking: 1912
- Completed: 1923

Specifications
- Length: 80 metres (260 ft)
- Width: 30 metres (98 ft)
- Materials: concrete
- Monument historique
- Official name: Cathédrale Saint-Charles-de-Borromé
- Reference no.: IA42000147

Website
- catholique-saint-etienne.cef.fr

Saint-Étienne Cathedral (French: Cathédrale Saint-Charles-de-Borromé de Saint-Étienne) is a Roman Catholic church dedicated to Saint Charles Borromeo, in Saint-Étienne, Loire, France.

It has been the cathedral of the Diocese of Saint-Étienne since its creation on 26 December 1970.

The building was constructed as an elaborate parish church between 1912 and 1923 in a primitive neo-Gothic style, on a Latin cross groundplan with transept and triple nave, and a belltower on the west front. The building is 80 metres (260 ft) long, 30 metres (98 ft) wide and 17 metres (56 ft) from the centre of the roof vault to the ground. The organ in the choir dates from 1930, and there is another very imposing one by A. Durand from 1968. The building was a highly ambitious one from the start, and remains unfinished.

== History ==
The project of a large church for a new parish was decided upon in 1830 to serve the rising population of the city consequent upon its industrial growth. The dedication to Charles Borromeo was an indirect compliment to the then monarch, Charles X.

A provisional chapel was built in the Rue Émile Combes in 1829, although only dedicated in 1840, as a temporary measure while the new large church was constructed. In the event the provisional structure had to serve until 1923. The extreme delay was due to sustained obstruction from the secularist authorities, which had disastrous consequences for the progress of the new church of Saint-Étienne. Plans for an impressive church were accepted in the 1860s, drawn up by Pierre Bossan, architect to the Archdiocese of Lyon, where his most significant work was the Basilica of Notre-Dame de Fourvière. After many years in storage they were destroyed in a fire, and had to be reconstructed by Adrien Rey, from preliminary drawings by Bossan's partner, Giniez, which had been kept by his children. The local architect who finally built the church from them was Francisque Dodat. The first stone was blessed on 3 November 1912, by Monsignor Déchelette, Auxiliary Bishop of Lyon.

However, two years later, the start of World War I further delayed construction until 1919. By that time inflation had reduced the value of the endowment and there was a shortage of labour, and the church that was eventually built, which was finished on 20 November 1923 but not consecrated until 23 May 1933 by Cardinal Maurin, Archbishop of Lyon, was significantly less than what had been planned: it is missing three of the intended four belltowers and a dome, as well as quantities of external and internal decorations.

In 1970, the church was elevated to a cathedral when the Diocese of Saint-Étienne was created. On this occasion, the choir was remodelled to conform to the liturgical prescriptions of the Second Vatican Council. In 2005, at the instigation of the Abbé Martin, rector, the layout was completed by the creation of an episcopal cathedral coherent with the altar and the ambo, on drawings by the architect Michel Goyet.

Built after the 1905 French law on the Separation of the Churches and the State, it is one of the few cathedrals in France owned by the diocese, which is wholly responsible for its upkeep.
