= Dominique Lebrun =

French Roman Catholic archbishop

Monseigneur Dominique Lebrun
- Archbishop of Rouen; Primate of Normandy
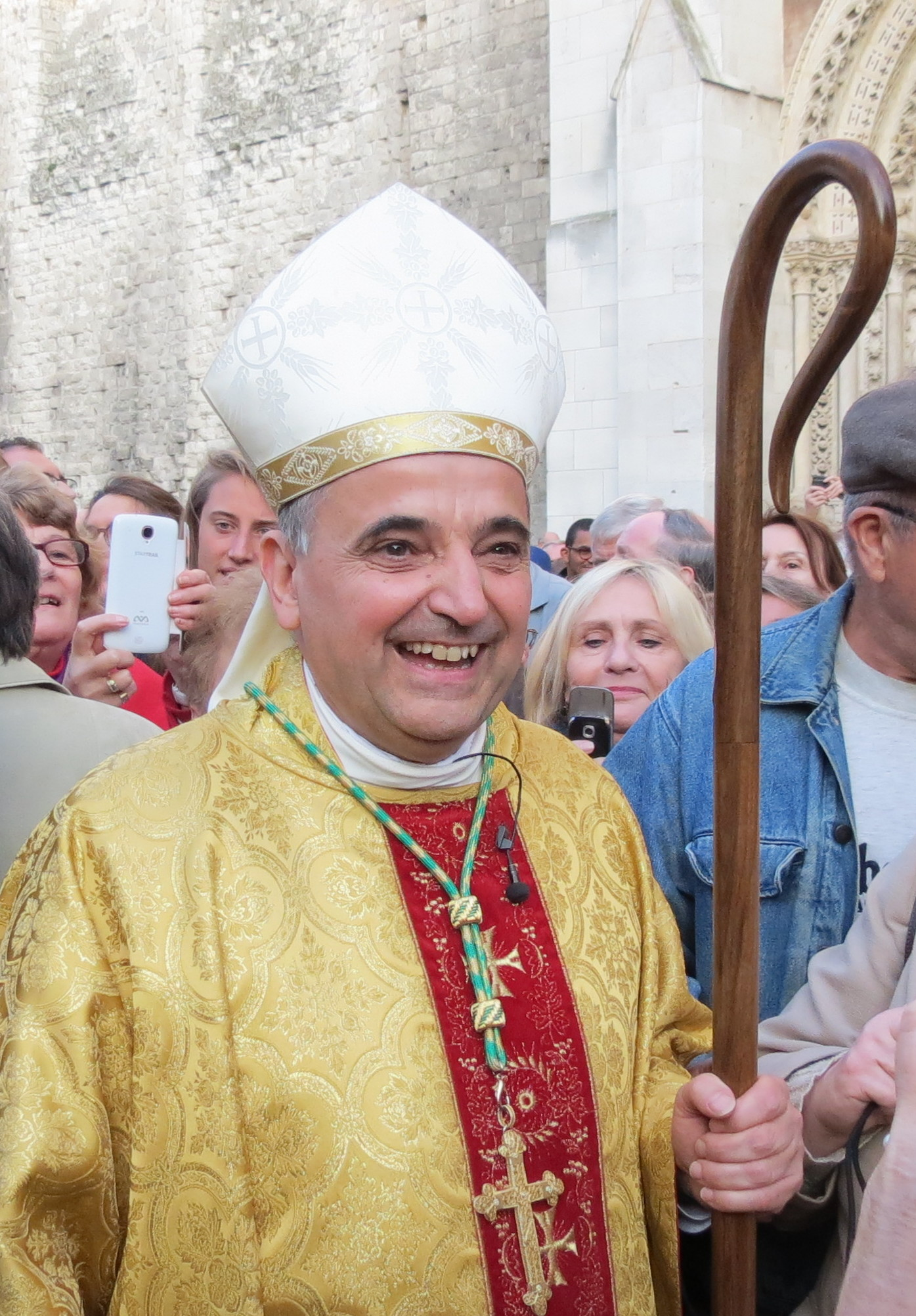
- Lebrun during his installation as Archbishop of Rouen, on 11 October 2015
- Archdiocese: Rouen
- Province: Rouen
- Appointed: 10 July 2015
- Installed: 11 October 2015
- Predecessor: Archbishop Emeritus Jean-Charles Descubes
- Previous post: Bishop of Saint-Étienne (2006–2015)

Orders
- Ordination: 9 June 1984
- Consecration: 9 September 2006 by Cardinal Barbarin
- Rank: Primate

Personal details
- Born: Dominique Julien Claude Lebrun; 10 January 1957 (age 69) Rouen, Normandy, France
- Denomination: Roman Catholic
- Residence: Archbishop's Palace, 2 rue des Bonnetiers, 76000 Rouen
- Parents: Auguste and Geneviève (née Facque) Lebrun
- Motto: VOS•DIXI•AMICOS; "I call you my Friends"; (Jn 15)
- Coat of arms: Dominique Lebrun's coat of arms

Ordination history of Dominique Lebrun
History
Episcopal consecration
- Consecrated by: Cardinal Barbarin

Dominique Lebrun (born 10 January 1957) is a French Roman Catholic prelate. Bishop of Saint-Étienne from 2006 to 2015, he was appointed Archbishop of Rouen and Primate of Normandy in July 2015.

== Biography ==
=== Youth and personal life ===
Dominique Julien Claude Marie Lebrun was born in Rouen to Auguste Lebrun, magistrate and Geneviève (née Facque) Lebrun, the last of a family of eight. He spent his early years in Rouen, before his family moved to Villemomble, a town near Paris. He was the son of a nun; his mother entered religion after she was widowed and her children had completed their curriculums. She took the religious name of Geneviève Marie. Dominique Lebrun served as an official football referee for 13 years.

=== Education ===
He studied at Panthéon-Assas University, where he obtained a master's degree in civil law. In 1978, he entered the French seminary in Rome, then went on to study at the Catholic University of Paris. He supported his PhD thesis in theological science in 1990.

== Ministries ==
Lebrun was ordained priest on 9 June 1984 in the Diocese of Saint-Denis. He was vicar of the parish of Saint-Baudile in Neuilly-sur-Marne from 1985 to 1994. That year, he became priest of the parish of Saint-Germain in Pantin, position he held until 1998.

He then became spiritual director at the French seminary in Rome until 2001, when he was sent back to the Diocese of Saint-Denis. He was responsible for the continuous training of new priests in the diocese, and was in charge of building connections with the economic and professional sectors in the Plaine-Saint-Denis. He officiated at the Church of Sainte-Geneviève de la Plaine in Saint-Denis. In 2003, he was appointed priest of the Basilica of Saint-Denis, and of the parishes around the city, and was named member of the Presbyterial Council.

From 1994 to 1997, he served as editor in chief of La Maison-Dieu, a pastoral and liturgical magazine of the Dominican Order, for which he kept writing articles occasionally until 2002

Appointed Bishop of Saint-Étienne on 28 June 2006, he was consecrated on 9 September of the same year by Cardinal Philippe Barbarin.

He was member of the Communication Committee of the Conference of French Bishops. From 2008 to 2012, he served as president of the Advisory Board of the French Christian radio network RCF. He is today member of the Family and Society Committee of the Conference, more particularly involved in Justice.

On 10 July 2015, he was appointed Archbishop of Rouen by Pope Francis. His installation took place on 11 October 2015 at Rouen Cathedral.

The new bells of the restored carillon of Rouen Cathedral, cast by Paccard, were christened on 3 April 2016 by Monseigneur Lebrun.

== Decoration and awards ==
- Mgr Lebrun was made a Knight of the Legion of Honour on 14 April 2017 by French President François Hollande.

== See also ==
- Catholic Church in France
- List of the Roman Catholic dioceses of France

Catholic Church titles
Preceded by Jean-Charles Descubes	Archbishop of Rouen; 2015–present	Succeeded by Incumbent
