= Paul-Marie François Rousset =

His Excellency Paul-Marie François Rousset, Ist. del Prado
- Bishop Emeritus of Saint-Étienne
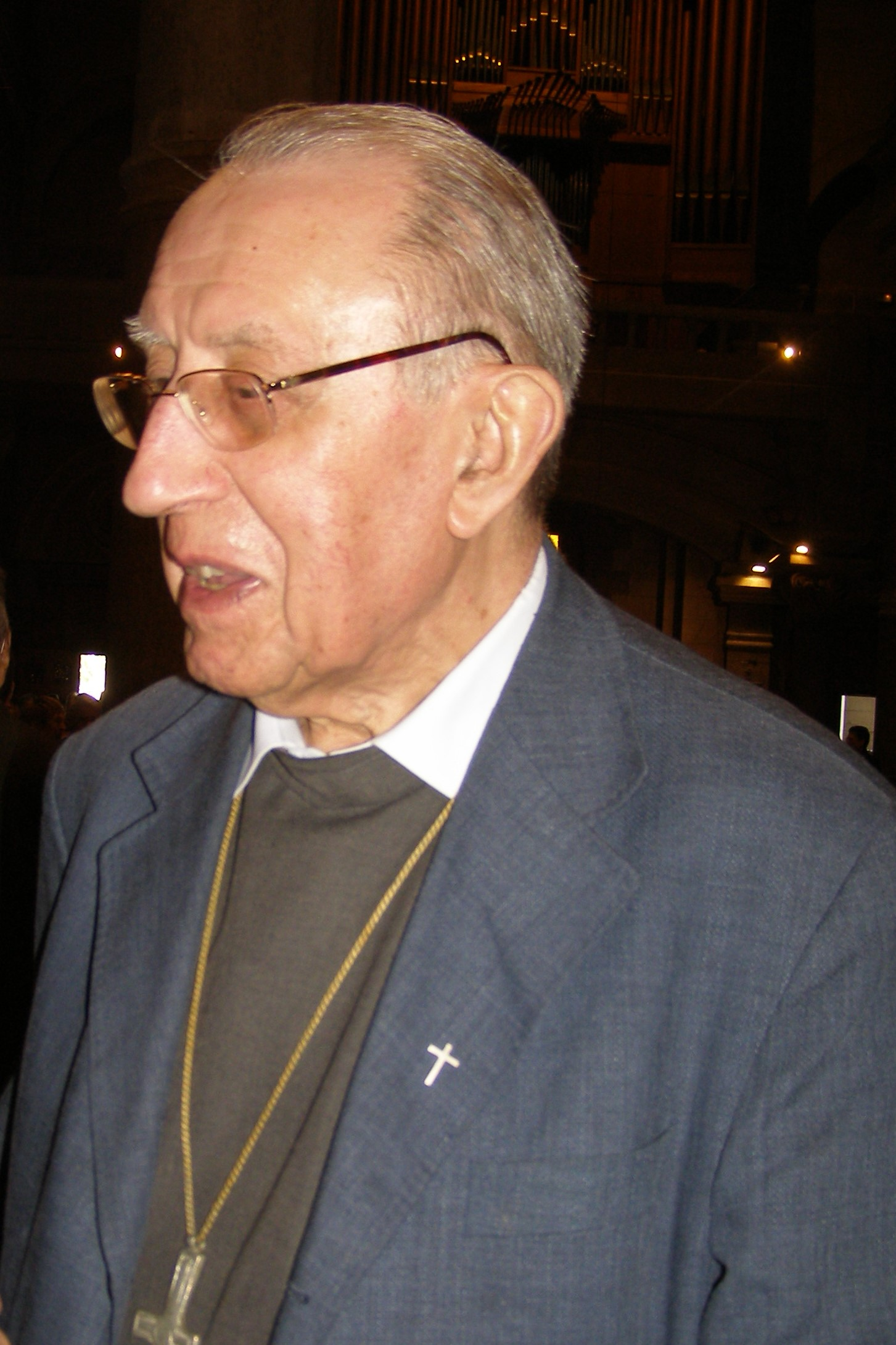
- Church: Roman Catholic Church
- See: Diocese of Saint-Étienne
- In office: 1971 - 1987
- Predecessor: none
- Successor: Pierre Jacques Joatton

Orders
- Ordination: February 24, 1945

Personal details
- Born: August 27, 1921 Grièges, France
- Died: January 9, 2016 (aged 94) Bourg-en-Bresse, Ain, France

Paul-Marie François Rousset, Ist. del Prado (August 27, 1921 – January 9, 2016), was a French prelate of the Roman Catholic Church.

Rousset was born in Grièges and was ordained a priest on February 24, 1945, from the religious order of Ist. del Prado. Rousset was appointed titular bishop of the Utimma as well as auxiliary archbishop of the Archdiocese of Lyon on January 24, 1966. He was ordained a bishop on March 6, 1966. Rousset was appointed bishop of Saint-Étienne on February 23, 1971, and resigned from the diocese on September 28, 1987. He died on January 9, 2016.
