= Archiepiscopal Palace, Rouen =

Archiepiscopal Palace of Rouen
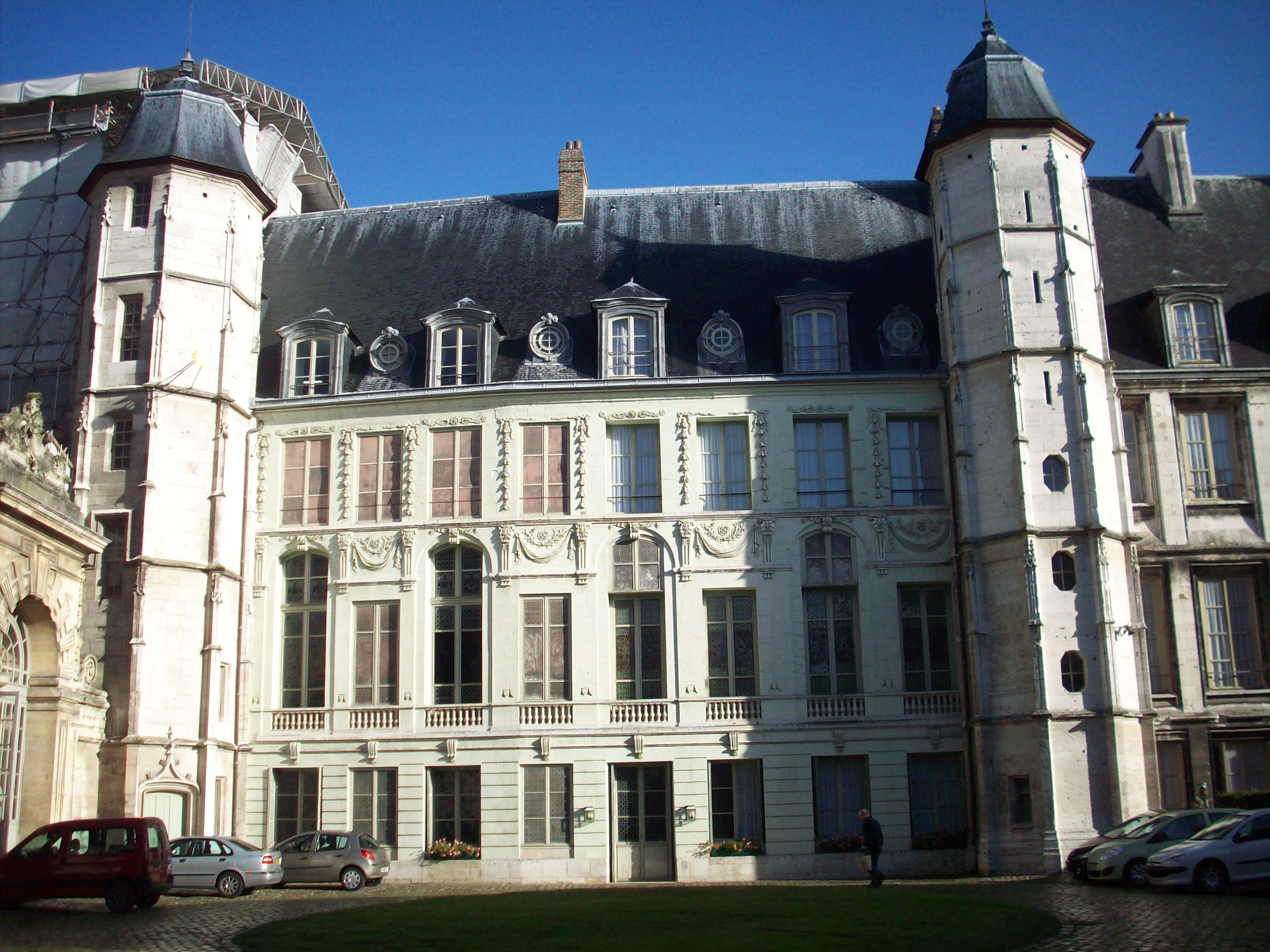
- Portion of the palace seen from the main entrance (the cathedral is covered by scaffoldings)

- Location of the Archiepiscopal Palace in France
- 49°26′25″N 01°05′47″E
- Location: 2 rue des Bonnetiers, 76000 Rouen, Rouen Metropolis, Normandy, France

History
- Built: Middle Ages

Site notes
- Architectural styles: Gothic and Renaissance architecture

Monument historique
- Official name: Ensemble archiépiscopal (Archiepiscopal ensemble)
- Designated: 1862 (first designation)
- Reference no.: PA00100800

The Archiepiscopal Palace of Rouen (French: Palais archiépiscopal de Rouen) is the official residence of the Metropolitan Archbishop of Rouen, Primate of Normandy. Designated a Monument Historique for the first time in 1862, it is notably the only archiepiscopal palace in France that is adjoining a cathedral while retaining its original function as official residence of the archbishop.

== History ==
The first episcopal residence was probably lying south of the nave of today's Cathedral. It is believed the archbishop's residence was moved to the northeast side of the cathedral when Norman invaders raided and plundered the region, and the Duchy of Normandy was created. Standing between the choir and the rue Saint Romain, the building was extended to the east, and came close to the moats of the former ramparts dating from the fourth century AD. William Bona Anima rebuilt the archiepiscopal palace. Of this building only subsists a basement room and the foundations of the walls between the portail des Libraires (Gate of the Librarians) and the tower at the angle of the rue Saint Romain, towards the courtyard of the Maîtrise Saint-Évode.

The gothic archiepiscopal palace, contemporary to the cathedral, was commissioned by William of Flavacourt. He supervised the construction of the watchtower and the great hall of which only the gable and the openwork remain. That is where was held the last of Joan of Arc's trials, which saw the saint sentenced to death on 29 April 1431, and where also took place her procès en réhabilitation (trial in rehabilitation) in 1456. The part of the palace where the archbishops resided was lying along the cour des Libraires (Courtyard of the Librarians). The palace was restored and extended by Cardinal Archbishop Lewis of Luxembourg.

When William of Estouteville was appointed Archbishop of Rouen, he decided to bring down the private apartments of the archbishop and commissioned the construction of a new building that would suit his taste. The ground floor, where the kitchens are located, was completed in 1462. In 1463, works were carried out to build the hall on the second floor, known today as the salle des États (Hall of States). (Note: Alike the salle des Procureurs (Prosecutors Hall) of Rouen's Parliament of Normandy (today the Law Court of Rouen), the salle des États was surmounted by a wood-panelled vault.) Works on the hall are completed in 1464. The same year, the winding staircase was finished. The overall cost was estimated at 400,000 pounds.

Georges d'Amboise succeeded to William of Estouteville in 1495. He extended the building until 1507, with the extension adding a further 2,000,000 pounds of work. As his predecessor, he demolished the archbishop's private apartments to clear up space for the current building, which houses the cour d'Église (Court of Church). It houses the housekeeper's office and the prison's cells on the ground floor, offices on the second floor and a court room on the third floor. He doubled the size of the episcopal residence by building a corps de logis on the same scale and erecting a second winding staircase that parallels the other constructed by Estouteville. He also built the pavillon Saint-Romain (Saint-Romain Pavilion) to the northeast side and the pavillon Notre-Dame (Notre-Dame Pavilion) to the southeast side. Initially terraced, the roofs were later covered. Guillaume Cornehaut, a gardener, created the plaisant jardin (Pleasant Garden) decorated with statues of Pierre de Vallence. A fountain comprising two ponds made of marble was erected between 1501 and 1507. It was surrounded by glass-panelled galleries which only lasted a few decades because of the Norman weather.

In 1650, the Assembly of Notables led by Louis XIV met in the Salle des États. In 1716, Archbishop Claude-Maur d'Aubigné required the demolition of the Episcopal Chapel built in the 13th century and the Chapelle de la Vierge (Chapel of the Virgin Mary). Archbishop Nicolas de Saulx-Tavannes had the large hall from the 14th century brought down. He replaced the gallery between the palace and the pavillon Saint-Romain by an ensemble of buildings known as the bibliothèque (library), to offer room for the collection of books he purchased from Pierre-Jules-César de Rochechouart, bishop of Évreux, in 1738. (Note: Scattered during the French Revolution, the collection was partly recovered by Cardinal Étienne Hubert de Cambacérès. It is currently housed in the Salle des Gardes (Hall of Guards).) He further added a monumental staircase leading directly to the Salle des États. In 1742, the grand entrance to the main courtyard was designed by Le Carpentier, replacing the former gate built early in the 14th century. Through the 18th century, the façades are reshaped, remodelled to bring unity in the architecture. The large gothic openworks are replaced by regular windows alternated with trompe-l'œil windows. Cardinal Dominique de La Rochefoucauld continued the renovation of the Salle des États by commissioning Hubert Robert four large mural paintings. Pierre-Louis Helin was required to make modifications to the Salle Synodale (Synodal Hall).

During the Revolution, the palace served as a wheat storage and residence for the armed forces before housing the city's administration. In 1802, the palace was returned to the archbishop. Under the Churches and State Separation Act 1905, the Archbishop Frédéric Fuzet was forced to leave the palace the next year. (Note: He temporarily settled in the second Couvent de la Visitation (Convent of the Visitation) before moving to the Seminary in 1910) Vacated until 1914, the building was used by the État-Major during World War I.

In 1920, Archbishop André du Bois de La Villerabel rented the palace. Thanks to the influence of his predecessor Louis-Ernest Dubois, the building was, for a second time, returned to the Archbishop of Rouen. The Archbishopric Palace underwent restorations in the 1990s.

The new Joan of Arc memorial in Rouen is located in the Archiepiscopal Palace since 2015. It allows visitors to visit rooms that were inaccessible to the public before its opening.

== Heritage Designations ==
Monument Historique

The architectural ensemble is protected under multiple Monument Historique designations. The Archiepiscopal Palace was classified on 9 February 1909. In 1992, the building was further protected and by 10 May 1995 all structures that have ever existed on that site were classified as well. The Archiepiscopal Palace, as for Rouen Cathedral and other parts of the city, is part of a Secteur Sauvegardé (Protected Area), which prevents any unsuitable modification of the architectural unity of the Old Town.

== Sources ==
- Bottineau-Fuchs, Yves (2001). Haute-normandie gothique. architecture religieuse. Picard. ISBN 978-2708406179.
- Delsalle, Lucien-René (2007). "L'archevêché au temps de Jacques Le Lieur". Rouen à la Renaissance (in French). Rouen: L'Armitière. pp. 238–256. ISBN 978-2952831413.
- Lemoine, François; Tanguy, Jacques (2004). Rouen aux 100 clochers : Dictionnaire des églises et chapelles de Rouen (avant 1789). Rouen: PTC. ISBN 978-2906258846. OCLC 496646300.
- Lescroart, Yves (2000). Rouen : la cathédrale Notre-Dame. Paris: Centre des monuments nationaux. ISBN 978-2858221523.
- Naillon, Edgar (1936). "L'archevêché". Rouen, ville d'art & d'histoire: Églises - chapelles et cimetières à travers les âges (in French). Rouen: Imprimerie commerciale du « Journal de Rouen ».
