= Primate (bishop) =

High-ranking bishop in certain Christian churches

Primate (/ˈpraɪmət/; Latin: primas) is a title or rank bestowed on some important archbishops in certain Christian churches. Depending on the particular tradition, it can denote either jurisdictional authority (title of authority) or (usually) ceremonial precedence (title of honour).

== Catholic Church ==
In the Latin Church, a primate is an archbishop—or, rarely, a suffragan or exempt bishop—of a specific (mostly metropolitan) episcopal see (called a primatial see) who has precedence over the bishoprics of one or more ecclesiastical provinces of a particular historical, political or cultural area. Historically, primates of particular sees were granted privileges including the authority to call and preside at national synods, jurisdiction to hear appeals from metropolitan tribunals, the right to crown the sovereign of the nation, and presiding at the investiture (installation) of archbishops in their sees.

Catholic Primate (non-cardinal) coat of arms

The office is generally found only in older Catholic countries, and is now purely honorific, enjoying no effective powers under canon law—except for the archbishop of Esztergom (Gran) in Hungary. Thus, e.g., the primate of Poland holds no jurisdictional authority over other Polish bishops or their dioceses, but is durante munere a member of the standing committee of the episcopal conference, and has honorary precedence among Polish bishops (e.g., in liturgical ceremonies). The Holy See has also granted Polish primates the privilege of wearing cardinal's crimson attire, except for the skullcap and biretta, even if they have not been made cardinals.

Where the title of primate exists, it may be vested in one of the oldest archdioceses in a country, often based in a city other than the present capital, but which was the capital when the country was first Christianized. The city may no longer have the prominence it had when the title was granted. The political area over which primacy was originally granted may no longer exist: for example, the archbishop of Toledo was designated "Primate of the Visigothic Kingdom", and the archbishop of Lyon is the "primate of the Gauls". The title of primate can, therefore, also be disputed between different archdioceses who, at some point, held proeminence over a shifting territory; such is the dispute over the Primacy of the Spains that was fought over by the Archdioceses of Braga, Toledo and Santiago de Compostela. After the founding of Portugal, the archbishop of Braga held precedence over all other archbishops in the country, though his role declined under the rise of the Archdiocese of Lisbon, which culminated in 1716, when Archbishop Tomás de Almeida (1670–1754) was elevated to patriarch.

Some of the leadership functions once exercised by primates, specifically presiding at meetings of the bishops of a nation or region, are now exercised by the president of the conference of bishops: "The president of the Conference or, when he is lawfully impeded, the vice-president, presides not only over the general meetings of the Conference but also over the permanent committee." The president is generally elected by the conference, but by exception the president of the Italian Episcopal Conference is appointed by the pope, and the Irish Catholic Bishops' Conference has the primate of All Ireland as president and the primate of Ireland as vice-president. Other former functions of primates, such as hearing appeals from metropolitan tribunals, were reserved to the Holy See by the early 20th century. Soon after, by the norm of the Code of Canon Law of 1917, confirmed in the 1983 Code, the tribunal of second instance for appeals from a metropolitan tribunal is "the tribunal which the metropolitan has designated in a stable manner with the approval of the Apostolic See".

The closest equivalent position in the Eastern Churches in 1911 was an Exarch.

The Holy See has continued in modern times to grant the title of primate. With the papal decree Sollicitae Romanis Pontificibus of 24 January 1956 it granted the title of Primate of Canada to the Archbishop of Quebec. As stated above, this is merely an honorary title involving no additional power.

A right of precedence over other bishops and similar privileges can be granted even to a bishop who is not a primate. Thus, in 1858, the Holy See granted the archbishop of Baltimore precedence in meetings of the United States bishops. The archbishop of Westminster has not been granted the title of primate of England and Wales, which is sometimes applied to him, but his position has been described as that of "chief metropolitan" and as "similar to" that of the archbishop of Canterbury.

The title of primate is sometimes applied loosely to the archbishop of a country's capital, as in the case of the archbishops of Seoul in South Korea and of Edinburgh in Scotland.

The pre-reformation metropolitan Archbishop of Nidaros was sometimes referred to as Primate of Norway, even though it is unlikely that this title ever was officially granted to him by the Holy See.

=== Catholic primatial sees ===
The heads of certain sees have at times been referred to, at least by themselves, as primates:

In Europe

- Andorra, Austria, Belgium, France, Germany, Liechtenstein, Luxembourg, Monaco, Netherlands, Portugal, Spain and Switzerland
  - Arles – Gaul and Spain
  - Auch – Novempopulania and the kingdom of Navarre
  - Bordeaux – Aquitaine
  - Bourges – Aquitaine (8th century)
  - Braga – the Spains, i.e., the Iberian Peninsula (since 440-446 d.C.)
  - Cologne – Germany 1240-
  - Lyons – the Gauls, i.e., the provinces called Lugdunenses
  - Magdeburg – Germany until 1566
  - Mainz – Germany 798-1802
  - Mechelen(-Brussels) – Belgium 1560–
  - Nancy – Lorraine 1602– (a notable exception, considering the fact that Nancy became a bishopric in 1777)
  - Narbonne
  - Regensburg – Germany 1802-1817; Confederation of the Rhine 1806–1813 (only the former title recognized by the papacy)
  - Reims – Gallia Belgica
  - Rouen – Normandy
  - Sens – Gauls and Germany
  - Salzburg – Germany 798/1689–
  - Tarragona – the Spains
  - Toledo – Visigothic Kingdom; the Spains (Bull of 1088)
  - Trier – Belgica prima until 1802
  - Utrecht – the Netherlands -[error: it was never a primatial see]
  - Vienne – Burgundy, Primate of Primates
- Belarus, Lithuania, Poland and Ukraine
  - Gniezno – Poland 1418-; Lithuania 1418-1795
  - Lviv (Latin) – Galicia and Lodomeria 1817-1848 (title conferred by the Emperor of Austria, but unrecognized by papacy)
  - Lviv (Eastern Catholic) – Galicia and Lodomeria 1848-1858 (title conferred by the Emperor of Austria, but unrecognized by papacy)
  - Warsaw – Congress Kingdom of Poland 1815-1829; Kingdom of Poland (1917–1918) 1916-1938
  - Vilnius – Lithuania 1661-1665 (title claimed by the bishop, but unrecognized elsewhere)
- Bulgaria
  - Veliko Tarnovo – Bulgaria and Vlachia (in Bulgaria) 1204–1235
- Czechia, Slovakia and Hungary
  - Esztergom(-Budapest) – Hungary –1541, 1820–
  - Nagyszombat (Trnava) – Hungary 1541–1820 -[error: it was never a primatial see]
  - Prague – Bohemia/Czechia 1344–; Czechoslovakia 1918–1992 (informally)
- Croatia, Italy, Montenegro, San Marino, Serbia and the Vatican City
  - Antivari (Bar) – Serbia (Primas Serviae)
  - Cagliari – Sardinia, (– 1158, 1409–)
  - Palermo – Sicily -[error: it was never a primatial see]
  - Pisa – Sardinia & Corsica (1158–)
  - Rome (the Papacy) – Italy 1929-
  - Salerno
  - Syracuse – Sicily, during the 1st millennium, recognized by Patriarchate of Constantinople -[error: it was never a primatial see]
  - Split – Dalmatia and All Croatia (13th century - 1828)
  - Venice – Dalmatia until 13th century
  - Zagreb – Croatia since 1828 (informally); Yugoslavia 1918–1992 (informally) -[error: it was never a primatial see]
- Denmark, Finland, Norway and Sweden
  - Lund – Scandinavia prior to the Reformation
- United Kingdom and Ireland
  - Armagh – All Ireland
  - Abernethy/Muthill/Dunblane/Strathearn – Scotland ca. 844–908
  - St Andrews – Scotland 908–
  - Canterbury – All England until 1558
  - Dublin – Ireland
  - Dunkeld – Scotland c. 844 (by royal grant, but refused by the Holy See)
  - Westminster – England and Wales 1850– (informally)
  - York – England until 1558

Elsewhere

- Carthage – Africa ancient, Pope Leo IX: 1893
- Canada - Quebec (1956)
- Archdiocese of Goa and Damaon, primatial see of the East, more specifically the East Indies
- Archdiocese of Santo Domingo, primatial (and oldest) see of the Indies
- Archdiocese of São Salvador da Bahia, primatial of Brazil (1551).
- Archdiocese of Santiago del Estero (transferred by Pope Francis in 2024) Archdiocese of Buenos Aires – Argentina (1936–2024) (the title was granted under Pope Pius XI on 29 January 1936).
- Archdiocese of Mexico, primatial of Mexico (granted by Pope Pius XII on 18 July 1951)

=== Regular clergy equivalent ===
In the modern confederation of the Benedictine Order, all the Black Monks of St. Benedict were united under the presidency of an Abbot Primate (Leo XIII, Summum semper, 12 July 1893); but the unification, fraternal in its nature, brought no modification to the abbatial dignity, and the various congregations preserved their autonomy intact. The loose structure of the Benedictine Confederation is claimed to have made Pope Leo XIII exclaim that the Benedictines were ordo sine ordine ("an order without order"). The powers of the Abbot Primate are specified, and his position defined, in a decree of the Sacred Congregation of Bishops and Regulars dated 16 September 1893. The primacy is attached to the global Benedictine Confederation whose Primate resides at Sant'Anselmo in Rome. He takes precedence of all other abbots, is empowered to pronounce on all doubtful matters of discipline, to settle difficulties arising between monasteries, to hold a canonical visitation, if necessary, in any congregation of the order, and to exercise a general supervision for the regular observance of monastic discipline. The Primatial powers are only vested in the Abbot Primate to act by virtue of the proper law of its autonomous Benedictine congregation, which at the present is minimal to none. However, certain branches of the Benedictine Order seem to have lost their original autonomy to some extent.

In a similar way the Confederation of Canons Regular of St. Augustine, elects an Abbot Primate as figurehead of the Confederation and indeed the whole Canonical Order. The Abbots and Superiors General of the nine congregations of confederated congregations of Canons Regular elect a new Abbot Primate for a term of office lasting six years. The Current Abbot Primate is Rt Rev. Fr Jean-Michel Girard, CRB, Abbot General of the Canons Regular of the Grand St Bernard.

== Anglicanism ==
Anglican usage styles the bishop who heads an independent church as its "primate", though commonly they hold some other title (e.g. archbishop, presiding bishop, or moderator). The primates' authority within their churches varies considerably: some churches give the primate some executive authority, while in others they may do no more than preside over church councils and represent the church ceremonially.

=== Anglican Communion ===
In the context of the Anglican Communion Primates' Meeting, the chief bishop of each of the thirty-nine churches (also known as provinces) that compose the Anglican Communion acts as its primate, though this title may not necessarily be used within their own provinces. Thus the United Churches of Bangladesh, of North India, of Pakistan and of South India, which are united with other originally non-Anglican churches, are represented at the meetings by their moderators.

In both the Church of England and the Church of Ireland, two bishops have the title of primate: the archbishops of Canterbury and York in England and of Armagh and Dublin in Ireland. Only the bishop of the senior primatial see of each of these two churches participates in the meetings.

The archbishop of Canterbury, who is considered primus inter pares of all the participants, convokes the meetings and issues the invitations.

Primates and archbishops are styled "The Most Reverend". All other bishops are styled "The Right Reverend", with the exception of the Bishop of Meath and Kildare in the Church of Ireland.

== Eastern Orthodox equivalent ==
Historically, the primatial title in Western Christianity corresponded to the title and office of supra-metropolitan exarch in Eastern Christianity. Such exarchs, or primates, were archbishops of Ephesus (for the Diocese of Asia), Heraclea (for the Diocese of Thrace) and Caesarea (for the Diocese of Pontus).

== Sources ==
- Meyendorff, John (1989). Imperial unity and Christian divisions: The Church 450-680 A.D. The Church in history. Vol. 2. Crestwood, NY: St. Vladimir's Seminary Press. ISBN 9780881410563.
