= Diocese of Saint-Étienne =

Catholic diocese in France

Coordinates: 45°24′47″N 4°23′56″E

Diocese of Saint-Étienne Dioecesis Sancti Stephani Diocèse de Saint-Étienne

Catholic
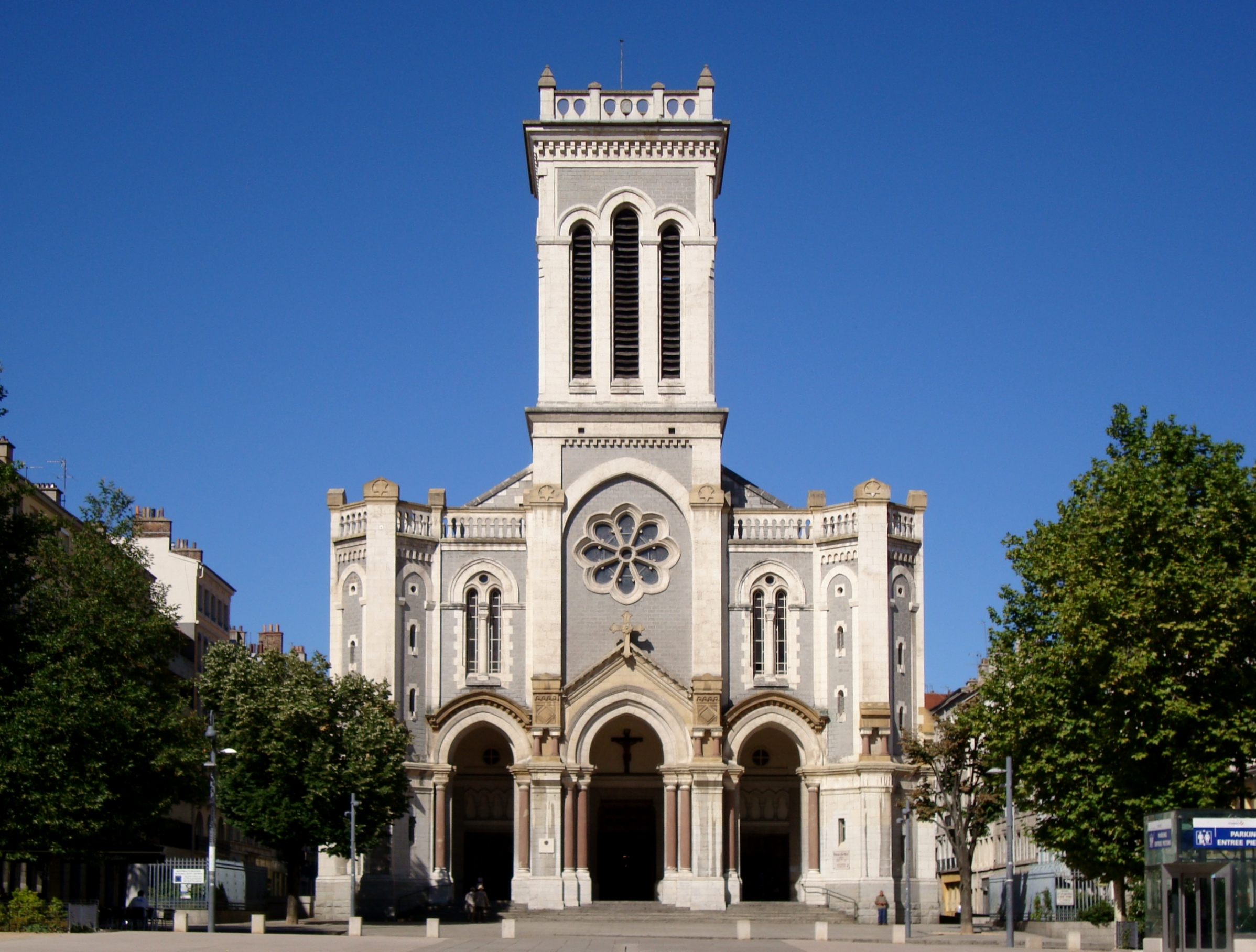
- Cathedral of S. Charles Borromeo

Location
- Country: France
- Ecclesiastical province: Lyon
- Metropolitan: Archdiocese of Lyon

Statistics
- Area: 3,035 km^{2} (1,172 sq mi)
- Population: Total; Catholics: (as of 2022); 603,000 (est.) ▲; 473,000 (est.) ▲
- Parishes: 25 ▼

Information
- Denomination: Roman Catholic
- Sui iuris church: Latin Church
- Rite: Roman Rite
- Established: 26 December 1970
- Cathedral: Cathedral of Saint Charles Borromeo in Saint-Étienne
- Patron saint: Saint Stephen
- Secular priests: 62 diocesan ▼15 (Religious Orders) ▼36 Permanent Deacons ▲

Current leadership
- Pope: Leo XIV
- Bishop: Vacant
- Metropolitan Archbishop: Olivier de Germay

Map

Website
- Website of the Diocese

The Diocese of Saint-Étienne (Latin: Dioecesis Sancti Stephani; French: Diocèse de Saint-Étienne) is a Latin diocese of the Catholic Church in France, based in the Loire department, on the left (western) bank of the Loire River, opposite Vienne. The distance by road from Vienne to Saint-Étienne is 51 km (32 mi).

== History ==
Since the mid-19th century, it was realized that the diocese of Lyon, consisting of the two civil departments of Loire and Rhône, was too large for efficient administration. Several attempts to reform the situation were made, notably in 1916, when a group of Catholics from Saint-Étienne petitioned the Vatican unsuccessfully for a division of the two departments. The Vatican's response was to appoint an auxiliary bishop of Lyon, who would reside at Saint-Étienne, a solution which persisted until 1971. Bishop Hyacinthe-Jean Chassagnon served as Auxiliary Bishop from 28 June 1917 to 19 June 1922, when he was appointed bishop of Autun. Bishop Etienne Bornet was Auxiliary Bishop from 16 December 1937 to 4 June 1958. Bishop Paul-Marie François Rousset was Auxiliary Bishop from 24 January 1966 to 23 February 1971, when he became the first bishop of Saint-Étienne.

The Diocese of Saint-Étienne was established on 26 December 1970 by Pope Paul VI, out of the Archdiocese of Lyon-Vienne and consists of the arrondissements of Saint-Étienne, and Montbrison, thus constituting the greater part of the department of the Loire, except the arrondissement of Roanne. In the preamble of the bull, Paul VI remarks that the principal driving force behind the legislation was the decree of the Second Vatican Council, Christus Dominus, promulgated on 28 October 1965. It called for a reorganization of dioceses and of diocesan boundaries in the light of demographic changes which had taken place in the 20th century. Negotiations were held, therefore, with the French Episcopal Conference, the archbishop of Lyon and his suffragan bishops. the papal nuncio in France, and the Vatican administration, and the decision was reached to establish a new diocese, which was made a suffragan of the archdiocese of Lyon.

Pope Paul was specifically insistent that a seminary be established, citing the Second Vatican Council's decree Optatam totius. Nonetheless, the number of priests in the diocese has declined from 384 (1980) to 77 (2022).

The seat of the bishop is the cathedral of Saint-Charles, in the city of Saint-Étienne, dedicated to Saint Charles Borromeo (French: Cathédrale Saint-Charles-de-Borromé de Saint-Étienne). The first stone of the church of S. Charles, which became the cathedral, was laid on 3 November 1912. Work was interrupted by World War I, and only resumed in 1919. The church was finally consecrated by Cardinal Archbishop Louis-Joseph Maurin (1916–1936) on 23 May 1933.

== List of bishops ==
- Paul-Marie François Rousset, 1971–1987
- Pierre Jacques Joatton, 1988–2006
- Dominique Lebrun, 2006–2015
- Sylvain Bataille (18 May 2016 – 16 October 2025)

== See also ==
- Roman Catholic Archdiocese of Lyon
- Catholic Church in France
- List of Catholic dioceses in France

== Sources ==
- Nizan, Jean (1993). "Le diocèse de Saint-Étienne....sans Roanne!...," (in French), in: R. Bergeron (ed.), Le Roannais: une région? un pays? Université de Saint-Etienne, Centre d'études foréziennes, 1993. pp. 243–250.
- Soleil, Christian (2017). Saint-Étienne: retour à la beauté. (in French). Saint-Denis: Editions Publibook, 2017.

=== External links ===
- David M. Cheney, Catholic-Hierarchy.org, "Diocese of Saint-Étienne."
- Diocese of Saint-Étienne official website, (in French).
