= Primate of Normandy =

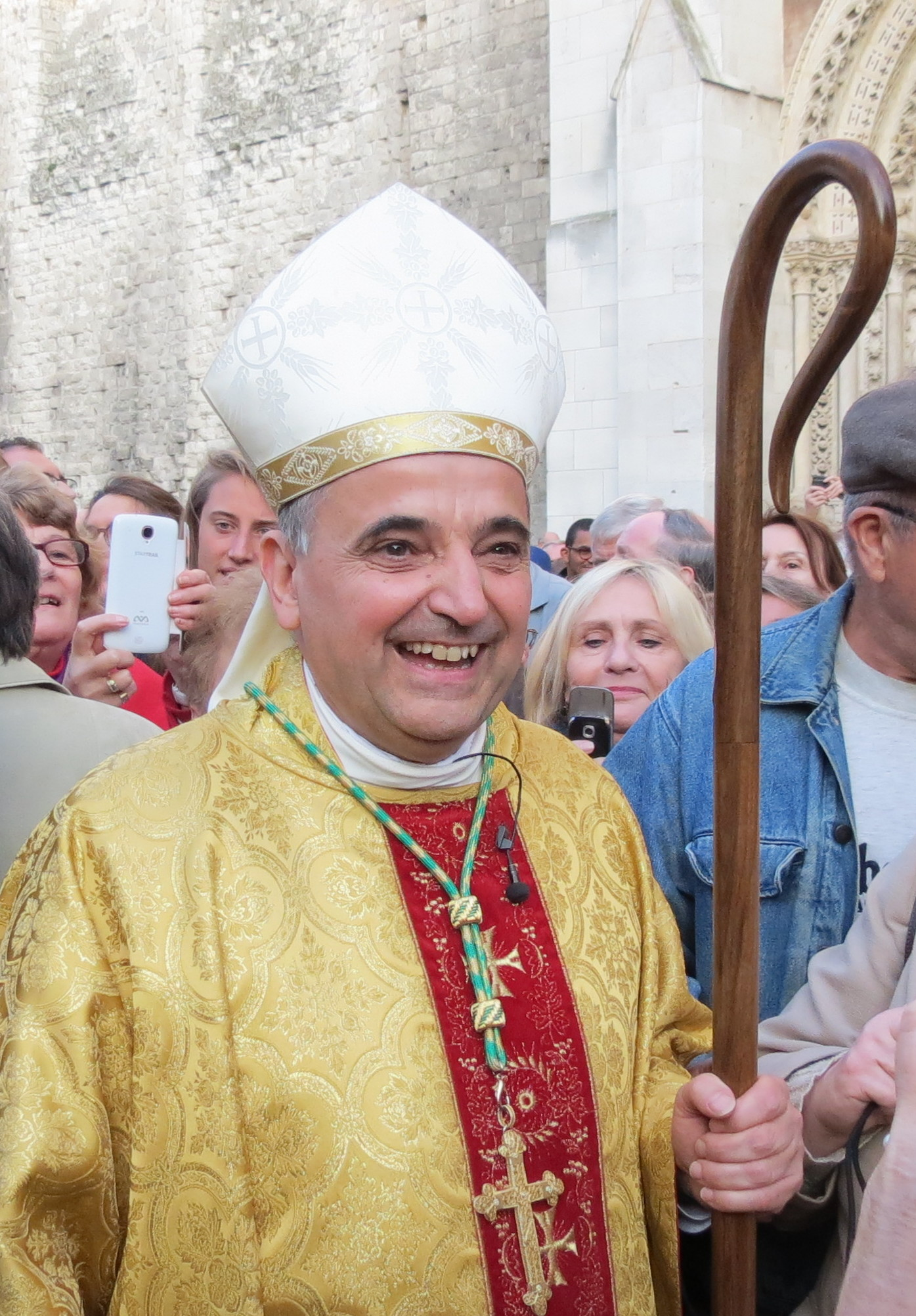
Mgr Dominique Lebrun, incumbent Primate of Normandy

Primate of Normandy (French: Primat de Normandie) is a Catholic Church title borne by the Metropolitan Archbishop of Rouen. The title is associated with the historical ecclesiastical status of the city of Rouen, which became an archbishopric in the 7th century and was the principal see of the region corresponding broadly to the former Roman province of Secunda Provincia Lugdunensis.

The primatial status of the Archbishop of Rouen was reaffirmed by Pope Callixtus III in papal bulls issued in 1457 and 1458. The title continues to refer to the Archbishop of Rouen's traditional precedence within the ecclesiastical province historically associated with Normandy.

== History ==
The title stems from the late Roman Empire: in the time of Constantine, the Romans across the Empire were evangelized. The evangelization happened chiefly in major provincial cities. During that crucial period in history, when Christianity spread throughout Europe, Rouen (la: Rothomagus) was the capital of the Secunda Provincia Lugdunensis. The city was evangelized in the early 2nd century AD. According to tradition, the first bishops were appointed in Rouen later in the 3rd century. The first Bishop of Rouen about whom some details are known was Saint Mellonius (fr: Saint Mellon) in the early 3rd century. The bishopric of Rouen became an archbishopric in the 7th century. The primates were often established in former Roman provincial capitals. This rule applied to the Metropolitan Archbishop of Rouen.

Pope Callixtus III, by papal bulls dating from 22 May 1457 and 11 July 1458, reaffirmed the Archbishop of Rouen as Primate of Normandy. The jurisdiction extends over a land roughly corresponding to the borders of the former Secunda Provincia Lugdunensis to this day.
