= List of Ancien Régime dioceses of France =

French Ancien Régime Roman Catholic dioceses and ecclesiastical provinces were heirs of Late Roman civitates (themselves created out of Gaulish tribes) and provinces.

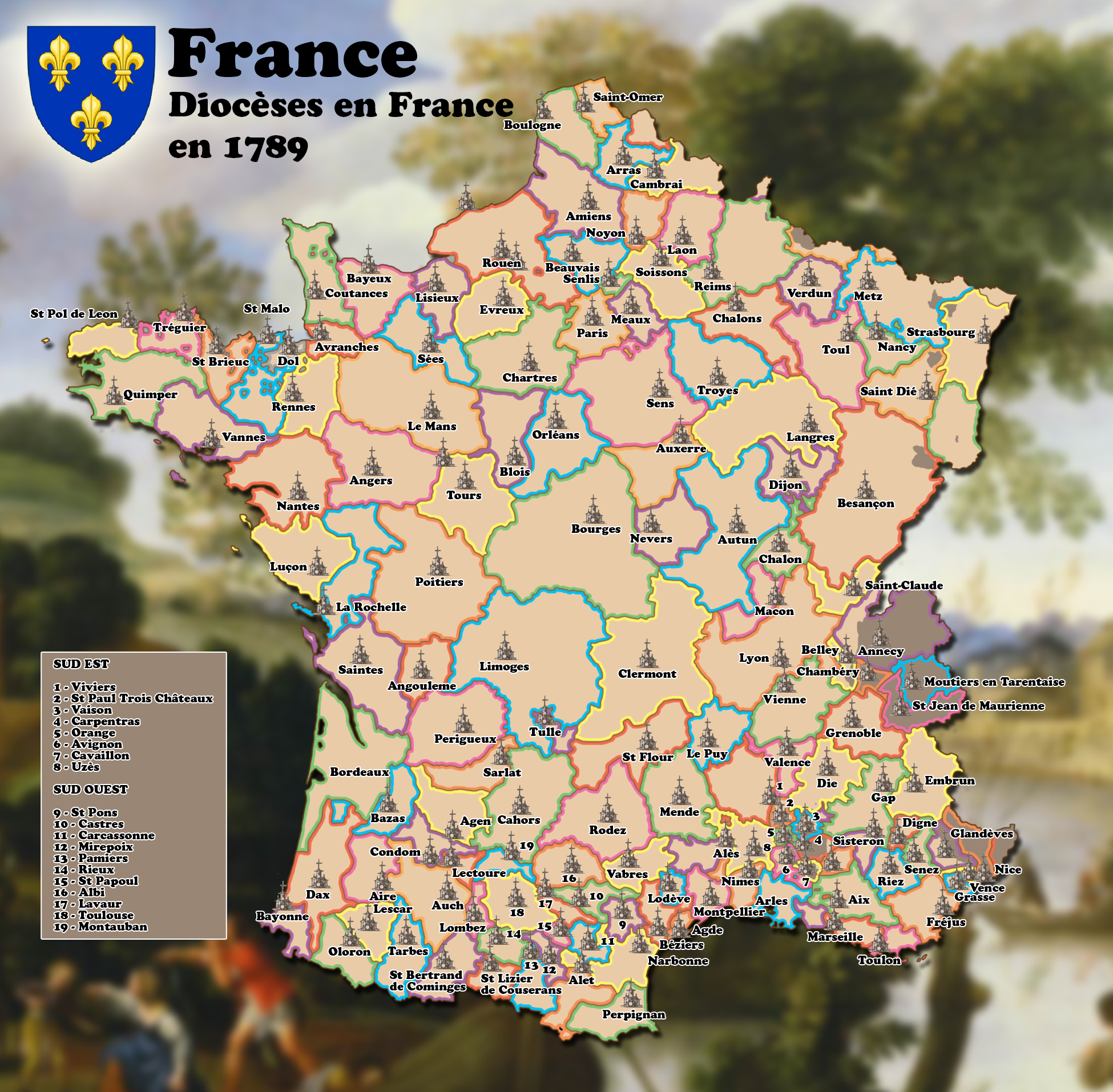
Dioceses in the Kingdom of France in 1789

== Historical sketch ==
Most of them were created during the first Christianization of Gaul, in the 3rd to 5th centuries.

But, at several occasions during the Middle Ages or the Ancien Régime, new dioceses were created, replacing older ones or carved out of them. For instance, the Albigensian Crusade entailed the creation of many new dioceses in the early 14th century. All the same, in 1789, on the eve of the French Revolution, the ecclesiastical map of France still very much recalled that of Roman Gaul. This explains why many dioceses and provinces did not coincide with French borders, with their head cities lying in present-day Belgium, Germany or Switzerland.

In 1790, this map was entirely revised to fit the new administrative map: dioceses were now to coincide with départements (the new administrative units). Ancien Régime dioceses all disappeared, then, in 1790. Many former bishoprics remained heads of the new dioceses, but many cities lost their bishop. Even so, in those cities, the former cathedral very often kept its rank as a cathedral church. This explains why many post-Revolutionary episcopal sees bear the name of several cities. For instance, in the département of the Drôme, only the city of Valence retained its bishop, the former episcopal sees of Die and Saint-Paul-Trois-Châteaux being suppressed, but the bishop retained the title of bishop of Valence, Die and Saint-Paul-Trois-Châteaux.

Here follows a list of Ancien Régime dioceses, as of 1789, on the eve of the Revolution. With the exception of those dioceses which were created in the Late Roman period (before the 6th century), whose date of creation generally cannot be established, we provide the date of creation and, when appropriated of suppression of the bishopric. Dioceses whose sees were not within the borders of the kingdom of France are in brackets.

== Listing of dioceses by church province ==
=== Province of Aix (Narbonensis Secunda) ===
- Archdiocese of Aix
- Diocese of Apt
- Diocese of Fréjus
- Diocese of Gap
- Diocese of Riez
- Diocese of Sisteron

=== Province of Arles (Viennensis Secunda) ===
- Archdiocese of Arles
- Diocese of Marseille
- Diocese of Orange
- Diocese of Saint-Paul-Trois-Châteaux
- Diocese of Toulon

out of which (1475):

==== Province of Avignon ====
- Archdiocese of Avignon — became a metropolitan see in 1475.
- Diocese of Carpentras
- Diocese of Cavaillon
- Diocese of Vaison

=== Province of Auch (Novempopulania) ===
- Archdiocese of Auch — became head of the province between 7th and 9th century, following the demise of the former metropolitan see of Eauze
- Diocese of Aire
- Diocese of Bazas
- Diocese of Dax, out of which:
  - Diocese of Bayonne — created late 8th century.
- Diocese of Lectoure
- Diocese of Lescar
- Diocese of Oloron
- Diocese of Saint-Bertrand-de-Comminges
- Diocese of Saint-Lizier
- Diocese of Tarbes

=== Province of Besançon (Maxima Sequanorum) ===
- Archdiocese of Besançon
- Diocese of Basel
- Diocese of Belley — moved to Belley in 537 (former see in Nyon).
- Diocese of Lausanne

=== Province of Bordeaux (Aquitania Secunda) ===
- Archdiocese of Bordeaux
- Diocese of Agen, out of which:
  - Diocese of Condom — Created 1317.
- Diocese of Angoulême
- Diocese of Périgueux, out of which:
  - Diocese of Sarlat — Created 1317.
- Diocese of Poitiers, out of which:
  - Diocese of Luçon — Created 1317.
  - Diocese of La Rochelle — Created in 1317 with its see in Maillezais. Was moved to La Rochelle in 1648.
- Diocese of Saintes

=== Province of Bourges (Aquitania Prima) ===
- Archdiocese of Bourges
- Diocese of Clermont, out of which:
  - Diocese of Saint-Flour — Created 1317.
- Diocese of Limoges, out of which:
  - Diocese of Tulle — Created 1317.
- Diocese of Le Puy

out of which (1678):

==== Province of Albi ====
- Archdiocese of Albi — became a metropolitan see in 1678. Out of which:
  - Diocese of Castres — created 1317.
- Diocese of Cahors
- Diocese of Mende — moved to Mende in the 6th century (former see was in Javols).
- Diocese of Rodez, out of which:
  - Diocese of Vabres — created 1317.

=== Province of Embrun (Alpes Maritimæ) ===
- Archdiocese of Embrun
- Diocese of Digne
- Diocese of Entrevaux — Actually in the hamlet of Glandèves.
- Diocese of Grasse — Moved to Grasse in 1244 (former see in Antibes. Belonged to the province of Aix-en-Provence down to 1057.
- Diocese of Nice
- Diocese of Senez
- Diocese of Vence

=== Province of Genoa ===
(Province created in 1133: Northern Corsican sees belonged to this province)

- Diocese of Mariana — The bishop resides in Bastia
- Diocese of Nebbio — The bishop resides in Saint-Florent

=== Province of Lyon (Lugdunensis Prima) ===
- Archdiocese of Lyon, out of which:
  - Diocese of Saint-Claude — Created 1742.
- Diocese of Autun
- Diocese of Langres, out of which:
  - Diocese of Dijon — Created 1731.
- Diocese of Chalon-sur-Saône
- Diocese of Mâcon

=== Province of Mainz (Germania Prima) ===
- Diocese of Speyer
- Diocese of Strasbourg
- other dioceses wholly in Germany

=== Province of Narbonne (Narbonensis Prima) ===
- Archdiocese of Narbonne, out of which:
  - Diocese of Alet — Created 1317.
  - Diocese of Carcassonne — Created late 6th century.
  - Diocese of Montpellier — Created late 6th century. Moved to Montpellier in 1536 (former see in Maguelonne).
  - Diocese of Perpignan — Created late 6th century. Moved to Perpignan in 1602 (former see in Elne).
  - Diocese of Saint-Pons — Created 1317.
- Diocese of Agde
- Diocese of Béziers
- Diocese of Lodève
- Diocese of Nîmes, out of which:
  - Diocese of Alès — Created 1694
- Diocese of Uzès

out of which (1317):

==== Province of Toulouse ====
- Archdiocese of Toulouse — Became a metropolitan see in 1317. Out of which:
  - Diocese of Lavaur — Created 1317
  - Diocese of Lombez — Created 1317
  - Diocese of Montauban — Created 1317
  - Diocese of Pamiers — Created 1295, out of which:
    - Diocese of Mirepoix — Created 1317
    - Diocese of Rieux — Created 1317
  - Diocese of Saint-Papoul — Created 1317

=== Province of Reims (Belgica Secunda) ===
- Archdiocese of Reims, out of which
  - Diocese of Laon — Created late 5th century.
- Diocese of Amiens
- Diocese of Beauvais
- Diocese of Châlons-en-Champagne
- Diocese of Senlis
- Diocese of Soissons
- Diocese of Noyon
- Diocese of Thérouanne — Suppressed 1553, out of which:
  - Diocese of Boulogne — Created 1567.
  - Diocese of Saint-Omer — Created 1559.

out of which (1559):

==== Province of Cambrai ====
- Archdiocese of Cambrai — Became a metropolitan see in 1559.
- Diocese of Arras
- Diocese of Tournai
- other dioceses in present-day Belgium, created in 1559.

==== Province of Mechelen/Malines ====
- Province and diocese of Mechelen created in 1559.
  - Diocese of Ypres — Created 1559.
- other dioceses in present-day Belgium and the Netherlands, created in 1559.

=== Province of Pisa ===
(Province created out of the Province of Rome in 1092: central and Southern Corsican sees belonged to this province)

- Diocese of Ajaccio
- Diocese of Aléria — The bishop resides in Cervione
- Diocese of Sagone — The bishop resides in Vico

=== Province of Rouen (Lugdunensis Secunda) ===
- Archdiocese of Rouen
- Diocese of Avranches
- Diocese of Bayeux
- Diocese of Coutances
- Diocese of Évreux
- Diocese of Lisieux
- Diocese of Sées

=== Province of Tours (Lugdunensis Tertia) ===
- Archdiocese of Tours
- Diocese of Angers
- Diocese of Le Mans
- Diocese of Nantes

Some dioceses of this province were part, in the 9th and 10th centuries, of an autonomous but

==== Short-lived Province of Dol ====
- Diocese of Dol — Created 6th century, was an autonomous archbishopric for about 1½ centuries after the mid 9th century.
- Diocese of Quimper — Created 6th century.
- Diocese of Rennes — Out of which a short-lived diocese of Redon in the 15th century.
- Diocese of Saint-Brieuc — Created 6th century.
- Diocese of Saint-Malo — Moved to Saint-Malo in the 12th century (former see was in Alet).
- Diocese of Saint-Pol-de-Léon — Created 6th century.
- Diocese of Tréguier — Created 6th century.
- Diocese of Vannes

=== Province of Sens (Lugdunensis Quarta) ===
- Archdiocese of Sens
- Diocese of Auxerre
- Diocese of Nevers
- Diocese of Troyes

out of which (1622):

==== Province of Paris ====
- Archdiocese of Paris — Became a metropolitan see in 1622.
- Diocese of Chartres, out of which:
  - Diocese of Blois — Created 1697.
- Diocese of Meaux
- Diocese of Orléans

=== Province of Tarentaise (Alpes Graiæ et Pœninæ) ===
- Archdiocese of Tarentaise — Its see was in Moûtiers.
- other sees in present-day Italy (diocese of Aosta) and Switzerland (diocese of Sion).

=== Province of Trier (Belgica Prima) ===
- (Archdiocese of Trier)
- Diocese of Metz
- Diocese of Toul, out of which:
  - Diocese of Nancy — Created 1777.
  - Diocese of Saint-Dié — Created 1777.
- Diocese of Verdun

=== Province of Vienne (Viennensis Prima) ===
- Archdiocese of Vienne
- Diocese of Die
- Diocese of Geneva — In the 16th century, following the Reformation, the see was moved to Annecy but kept its name.
- Diocese of Grenoble
- Diocese of Maurienne
- Diocese of Valence
- Diocese of Viviers
