= Monseigneur =

French monarchic honorific

Monseigneur (plural: Messeigneurs or Monseigneurs) is an honorific in the French language, abbreviated Mgr., Msgr. In English use it is a title before the name of a French prelate, a member of a royal family or other dignitary.

Monsignor is both a title and an honorific in the Catholic Church. In Francophone countries, it is rendered Monseigneur, and this spelling is also commonly encountered in Canadian English practice. In France, monsignori are not usually addressed as monseigneur, but by the more common term monsieur l'abbé, as are priests.

== History ==
As early as the fourteenth century it was the custom to address persons high in rank or power with the title Monseigneur or Monsignore. Until the seventeenth century, French nobles demanded from their subjects and dependents the title of Monseigneur. In international intercourse two titles gradually won general recognition, Monsieur as the title of the eldest brother of the King of France (if not heir presumptive) and Monseigneur for the Dauphin, or eldest son of the French king, who was also the crown prince, or for whatever male member of the family was recognized as heir presumptive to the throne.

This form of formal address is currently still in use at courts in Belgium, Luxembourg, Monaco, and France. Royal princes are formally addressed in the old French style. By tradition a Belgian or Luxembourgian prince is addressed as "Monseigneur" rather than "Your Royal Highness". The word Monseigneur is used when addressing a prince in any of Belgium's official languages, there being no Dutch or German equivalent. In France, it is also sometimes used when addressing pretenders to the French throne Jean, Count of Paris and Louis Alphonse, Duke of Anjou, and when addressing Albert II, Sovereign of Monaco (French style always is used in Monaco). The spouse of the prince is addressed as Madame.

== Addressing ==
Prior to the overthrow of the French monarchy in 1792, the title Monseigneur equated to His Royal Highness or His Serene Highness when used as part of the title of a royal prince, as in Monseigneur le comte de Provence. King Louis XIV promoted the use of Monseigneur without the title as a style for the dauphin de France but this use lapsed in the 18th century. French royalists commonly style the current pretender Monseigneur.

== In literature ==
In A Tale of Two Cities, Charles Dickens uses this honorific as a collective noun denoting the great nobility as a class.

In Les Misérables, Victor Hugo uses this term to describe members of the clergy present in the introductory sequence of the novel.
