= Bourges (disambiguation) =

Bourges is a city in central France which is capital of the department of Cher.

Bourges may also refer to:

== People ==
=== Surname ===
- Élémir Bourges (1852-1925), French novelist
- Julián Bourges (before 1944 - 1976), Argentinian film actor
- Maurice Bourgès-Maunoury (1914-1993), French politician
- Yvon Bourges (1921-2009), French politician and colonial administrator

=== Other people ===
- Arcadius of Bourges (died 549), French bishop
- Felix of Bourges (died c. 580), French bishop
- Odo Arpin of Bourges (c. 1060 – c. 1130), French viscount, crusader and monk
- Patroclus of Bourges (c. 496 – 576), French ascetic and saint
- Sulpitius I of Bourges (died 591), French bishop
- Ursinus of Bourges (3rd or 4th century), French bishop and saint

== Topics associated with the city ==
- Arrondissement of Bourges
- Bourges 18, an association football club
- Bourges Airport
- Bourges Cathedral
- Communauté d'agglomération Bourges Plus
- Council of Bourges, a church council of 1225
- Bourges station, a railway station
- Cantons of Bourges, administrative units
- CJM Bourges Basket, a women's basketball club
- Paris–Bourges, a road bicycle race
- Pragmatic Sanction of Bourges, a decree issued by King Charles VII of France in 1438
- Printemps de Bourges, an annual music festival
  - Live Printemps de Bourges 2002, an album by Jean-Michel Jarre
- Roman Catholic Archdiocese of Bourges
- Timeline of Bourges
- University of Bourges

== See also ==
- Boulton Paul Bourges, a series of British prototype twin-engined biplane day bombers 1918-24
- Bourge, a surname
