= Armand Maillard =

- Archbishop Emeritus of Bourges
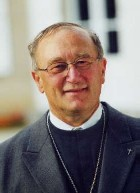
- Mgr Armand Maillard in 2012
- Church: Catholic Church
- Archdiocese: Archdiocese of Bourges
- In office: 11 September 2007 – 25 July 2018
- Predecessor: Hubert Barbier
- Successor: Jérôme Daniel Beau
- Previous post: Bishop of Laval (1996-2007)

Orders
- Ordination: 28 June 1970 by Jean-Félix-Albert-Marie Vilnet
- Consecration: 5 October 1996 by Louis-Marie Billé

Personal details
- Born: 18 June 1943 (age 83) Offroicourt, Forbidden Zone, Occupied France, Nazi Germany

Armand Maillard (born 18 June 1943, Offroicourt) is a French prelate of the Roman Catholic Church who served as the Archbishop of Bourges.

He was appointed to that position by Pope Benedict XVI on 11 September 2007, succeeding Archbishop Hubert Barbier. The new archbishop, who also received the honorary title of patriarch and primate of Aquitaine, was greeted in his cathedral on 14 October and took his seat in the presence of the bishops of the province: Archbishops Bernard-Nicolas Aubertin, Metropolitan Archbishop of Tours; André Fort, bishop of Orleans; Michel Pansard, Bishop of Chartres; Maurice de Germiny, Bishop of Blois.

== Career ==
He completed theological studies at the Strasbourg Faculty of Catholic Theology from 1967 to 1971. He holds two licenses, the first in letters (in German) and the second in theology. He was ordained a priest on 28 June 1970.

He was assigned responsibility in 1976 throughout the diocese for catechesis, and was named head of the permanent diaconate. He continued to also be a chaplain in high schools. From 1987 to 1996 he was secretary of the Apostolic East region.

He was named Bishop of Laval by Pope John Paul II on 2 August 1996, and consecrated by the Archbishop of Aix, Louis-Marie Billé, on 5 October.

He was archbishop of Bourges from 2007 until July 2018. In this role he helped the Little Sisters Disciples of the Lamb obtain the definitive recognition of their statutes in 2011.

Within the Bishops' Conference of France, he was a member of the Commission of ordained ministries.

== See also ==
- Catholic Church in France
- List of the Roman Catholic dioceses of France
