= Franc Šuštar =

Slovenian Roman Catholic prelate (born 1959)

Mons. Franc Šuštar
- Auxiliary Bishop of Archdiocese of Ljubljana
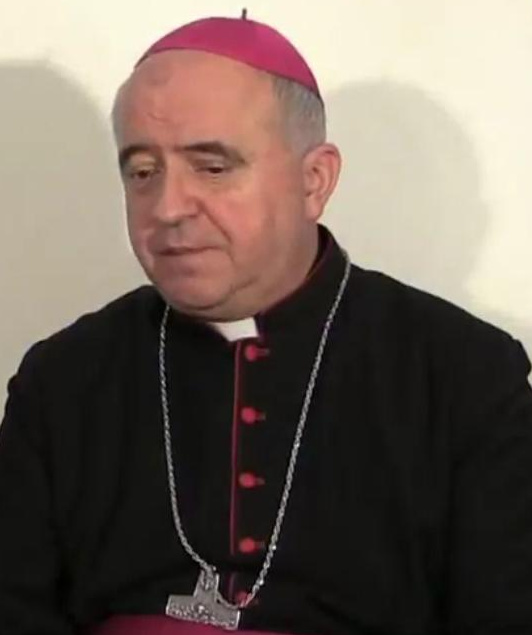
- Church: Roman Catholic Church
- Appointed: 7 February 2015
- Other posts: Titular Bishop of Ressiana; Vicar General of Archdiocese of Ljubljana (2015–present)

Orders
- Ordination: 29 June 1985 (Priest)
- Consecration: 15 March 2015 (Bishop) by Stanislav Zore

Personal details
- Born: Franc Šuštar; 27 April 1959 (age 67) Ljubljana, FPR Yugoslavia (present day Slovenia)
- Education: University of Ljubljana, Pontifical Gregorian University

Franc Šuštar (born 27 April 1959) is a Slovenian Roman Catholic prelate who serves as a Titular Bishop of Ressiana and Auxiliary Bishop of Archdiocese of Ljubljana since 7 February 2015.

== Education ==
Bishop Šuštar was born into a Roman Catholic family in the capital of Slovenia, but spent his childhood in a peasant family in the village of Preserje pri Radomljah in the parish of Homec.

After finishing primary school, Franc graduated a Minor Seminary in Vipava with the secondary education during 1974–1978 and also served his compulsory military service in the Yugoslavian Army. After that, he was admitted to the Major Theological Seminary in Ljubljana and in the same time joined the Theological Faculty at the University of Ljubljana, where he studied two years, until he was sent to Rome. Here he continued his seminary formation in the Collegium Germanicum et Hungaricum and completed his studies with a Doctor of Theology degree in Fundamental theology at the Pontifical Gregorian University and was ordained as priest on June 29, 1985, for his native Archdiocese of Ljubljana.

Coat of arms of Bishop Franc Šuštar

== Pastoral work ==
After his ordination Fr. Šuštar was engaged in pastoral work and served as priest in Ljubljana-Moste and Ljubljana-Fužine parishes from 1985 until 1991.

From 1991 to 1997 he was the director of the Major Theological Seminary in Ljubljana. He then became a parish priest in Grosuplje, where he served from 1997 until 2005. For two years, Archbishop Alojz Uran appointed him cathedral pastor in Ljubljana and archdeacon. After two years, in 2007 he was re-appointed director of the Major Theological Seminary in Ljubljana and a canon of the cathedral chapter. He also worked as an Econom at the Major Seminary.

== Prelate ==
On February 7, 2015, he was appointed by Pope Francis as the Titular Bishop of Ressiana and Auxiliary Bishop of the Archdiocese of Ljubljana. On March 15, 2015, he was consecrated as bishop by Archbishop of Ljubljana Stanislav Zore and other prelates of the Roman Catholic Church in the Cathedral of St. Nicholas in Ljubljana.

Also from 2015 he is serving as the Vicar General of this Archdiocese.

Catholic Church titles
Preceded by Jean-Pierre Batut	Titular Bishop of Ressiana; 2015–present	Succeeded by Incumbent
