= Jean-Pierre Batut =

French bishop

- Bishop of Blois
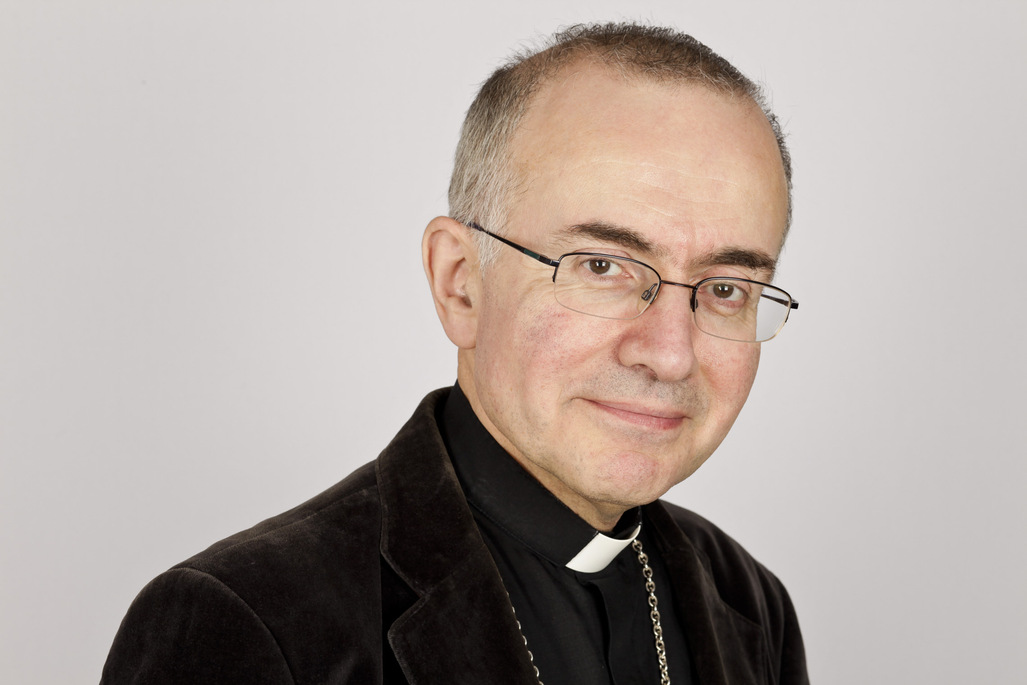
- Jean-Pierre Batut in 2015
- Church: Catholic Church
- Diocese: Diocese of Blois
- In office: 22 November 2014 – 26 June 2023
- Predecessor: Maurice de Germiny
- Successor: Francis Bestion
- Other posts: Auxiliary Bishop of Toulouse (since 2023); Titular Bishop of Maillezais (since 2023)
- Previous posts: Titular Bishop of Ressiana (2008-2014); Auxiliary Bishop of Lyon (2008-2014)

Orders
- Ordination: 23 June 1984 by Jean-Marie Lustiger
- Consecration: 10 January 2009 by Philippe Barbarin

Personal details
- Born: Jean-Pierre Louis Roger Sylvain Batut; 3 July 1954 (age 72) Paris, France
- Coat of arms: Jean-Pierre Batut's coat of arms

Jean-Pierre Batut (born in Paris, 3 July 1954) is a French bishop and theologian. Appointed bishop of Blois (22 November 2014) and installed there on 11 January 2015, he served in the Issy-lès-Moulineaux seminary near Paris, and as Curé of Ste. Jeanne de Chantal church in the XVI^{e} Arrondissement of Paris before being appointed auxiliary bishop of Lyon (with the title of Ressiana).

== Career ==
Hitherto best known as a theologian, his doctoral thesis explored the doctrine of divine omnipotence in patristic thought prior to the Council of Nicaea (325) and its publication in 2009 as Pantocrator was well received.

According to French and Italian newspaper reports his appointment as bishop of Metz in the Concordat zone of Alsace-Moselle in eastern France in 2013 appears to have been overruled by the French Minister of Interior. A question on this point was asked in the French parliament on 22 October 2013.

In April 2015 bishop Batut criticized President Hollande's reference to 'Egyptian citizens (ressortissants égyptiens) massacred in Libya', a euphemism followed abundantly in French official and journalistic sources and intended to avoid reference to Christians being killed but which has now been abandoned by the French élite. Since 9 September 2023 he is auxiliary bishop in Lyon. Pope Francis wrote him delegation on 26 June 2023.

== Selected works ==
- Pantocrator : "Dieu le Père tout-puissant" dans la théologie prénicéenne (Collection des Etudes Augustiniennes, série Antiquité 189, institut des Etudes Augustiniennes), Brepols 2009

== See also ==
- Catholic Church in France
- List of the Roman Catholic dioceses of France
