= Louis-Marie Billé =

French clergyman

His Eminence Louis-Marie Billé
- Cardinal, Archbishop of Lyon
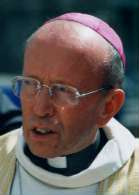
- Church: Roman Catholic Church
- Archdiocese: Lyon
- Predecessor: Jean Marie Balland
- Successor: Philippe Barbarin

Orders
- Ordination: 25 March 1962
- Consecration: 19 May 1984
- Created cardinal: 21 February 2001 by Pope John Paul II
- Rank: Cardinal-Priest

Personal details
- Born: 18 February 1938 Fleury-les-Aubrais, France
- Died: 12 March 2002 (aged 64) Bordeaux, France
- Coat of arms

Styles of Louis-Marie Billé
- Reference style: His Eminence
- Spoken style: Your Eminence
- Informal style: Cardinal
- See: Lyon

Louis-Marie Billé (18 February 1938 – 12 March 2002) was a French clergyman, archbishop of Lyon from 6 September 1998 and a cardinal until his death in office.

== Life ==
Billé was born in Orléans to Gabriel Léandre François Victor Billé and Madeleine Louise David.

He studied Catholic Theology and Philosophy in Luçon, Angers (Catholic University of the West), Rome and Jerusalem, specialising in Biblical Theology. His career in the clergy began on 25 March 1962 when he was ordained priest for the diocese of Luçon.

From 1966 to 1972 he worked as a lecturer at the priests' seminary in Luçon, and from 1972 to 1977 he performed the same task at the seminary of La Roche-sur-Yon.

Pope John Paul II appointed him Bishop of Laval on 10 May 1984, transferring him in 1995 to the diocese of Aix, Arles and Embrun.

He published Jean-Paul II avec l`Eglise de France - La vitalité de l`Evangile in 1997.

He would become Archbishop of Lyon on 10 July 1998. On 21 February 2001 he was appointed to the College of Cardinals with the title of Cardinal-Priest of San Pietro in Vincoli. Later in the same year the title of Santissima Trinità al Monte Pincio was transferred to him.

Cardinal Billé died in Bordeaux on 12 March 2002 after a serious illness and was entombed in Lyon cathedral. He was succeeded as Archbishop of Lyon by Bishop Philippe Barbarin.

Catholic Church titles
Preceded by Paul-Louis Carrière	Bishop of Laval; 10 May 1984 – 1995	Succeeded by Armand Maillard
Preceded by Bernard Panafieu	Bishop of Aix, Arles and Embrun; 1995 – 10 July 1998	Succeeded by Claude Feidt
Preceded by Jean Marie Balland	Archbishop of Lyon; 10 July 1998 – 12 March 2002	Succeeded by Philippe Barbarin
Preceded by Leo Joseph Suenens	Cardinal-Priest of the San Pietro in Vincoli; 21/02 – 1/03/1998	Succeeded by Pio Laghi
