= Hubert Barbier =

French Roman Catholic prelate (born 1932)

The Most Reverend Hubert Marie Pierre Dominique Barbier
- Archbishop of Bourges
- Church: Roman Catholic Church
- Archdiocese: Bourges
- Installed: 25 April 2000
- Term ended: 11 September 2007
- Predecessor: Pierre Plateau
- Successor: Armand Maillard
- Previous posts: Auxiliary Bishop (1980–1984) and Bishop (1984–2000) of Diocese of Annecy

Orders
- Ordination: 18 September 1955 by Antoine-Marie Cazaux
- Consecration: 13 December 1980 by Charles-Auguste-Marie Paty

Personal details
- Born: Hubert Marie Pierre Dominique Barbier; 4 August 1932 (age 94) La Chaize-le-Vicomte, Vendée, France
- Education: Gregorian Pontifical University

Hubert Marie Pierre Dominique Barbier (born 4 August 1932) is a French Roman Catholic prelate who served as the Archbishop of Bourges from 2000 to 2007. He previously served as the Bishop of Annecy from 1984 to 2000 and as an auxiliary bishop of the Diocese of Annecy from 1980 to 1984.

== Early life and priesthood ==
Hubert Marie Pierre Dominique Barbier was born on 4 August 1932 in La Chaize-le-Vicomte, in the Vendée department of France. After his secondary education, he studied first at the Lycée Richelieu in La Roche-sur-Yon, then at the Major Seminary of Issy-les-Moulineaux in Paris, and after at the Gregorian Pontifical University, earning a licentiate in theology and canon law. He was ordained a priest for the Diocese of Luçon on 18 September 1955.

Following his ordination, Barbier served as an assistant pastor, a seminary instructor, and later as the director of religious education for the diocese. In 1978, he was appointed vicar general of the Diocese of Luçon.

== Episcopal ministry ==
=== Auxiliary Bishop of Annecy ===
On 6 October 1980, Pope John Paul II appointed Barbier as the Auxiliary Bishop of the Diocese of Annecy and titular bishop of Noba. He received his episcopal consecration on 13 December 1980 from Charles-Auguste-Marie Paty, the Bishop of Luçon, with Jean-Baptiste Sauvage and Jean-Charles Thomas serving as co-consecrators.

=== Bishop of Annecy ===
Barbier was appointed as a diocesan bishop of the Diocese of Annecy on 19 May 1984, succeeding Jean-Baptiste Sauvage. He served as the ordinary of Annecy for nearly sixteen years. Within the Bishops' Conference of France, he was highly active in the commissions for the pastoral care of health, and family-related matters.

=== Archbishop of Bourges ===
On 25 April 2000, Pope John Paul II appointed Barbier as the Archbishop of Bourges, succeeding Pierre Plateau.

During his tenure in Bourges, he was a president of the Standing Committee for Economic Affairs, a member of the French Canonical Committee, and a member of the Episcopal Commission for Consecrated Life. He also served for ten years as president of the Steering Committee for Christian Radio in France within the French Bishops' Conference, serving from 2000 to 2006.

Upon reaching the mandatory retirement age of 75, Barbier submitted his resignation to the Holy See. Pope Benedict XVI accepted his retirement on 11 September 2007, and he was succeeded by Armand Maillard. Following his retirement, he returned to his native Vendée to assist in local parish ministry.
