= Paul Marie André Richaud =

French Catholic cardinal (1887–1968)

His Eminence Paul-Marie-André Richaud
- Cardinal, Archbishop of Bordeaux
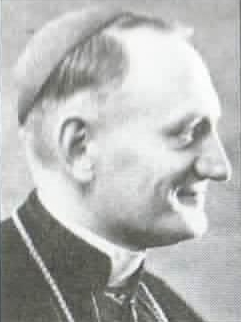
- Church: Catholic Church
- Archdiocese: Bordeaux
- Appointed: 10 February 1950
- Installed: 20 March 1950
- Term ended: 5 February 1968
- Predecessor: Maurice Feltin
- Successor: Marius-Félix-Antoine Maziers
- Other post: Cardinal-Priest of Santi Quirico e Giulitta (1958-68)
- Previous posts: Titular Bishop of Irenopolis in Isauria (1933-38); Auxiliary Bishop of Versailles (1933-38); Bishop of Laval (1938-50)

Orders
- Ordination: 28 June 1913 by Charles-Henri-Célestin Gibier
- Consecration: 25 January 1934 by Benjamin-Octave Roland-Gosselin
- Created cardinal: 15 December 1958 by John XXIII
- Rank: Cardinal-Priest

Personal details
- Born: Paul-Marie-André Richaud; 16 April 1887 Versailles, France
- Died: 5 February 1968 (aged 80) Bordeaux, France
- Education: Pontifical Gregorian University
- Motto: Vinctus Christi
- Coat of arms

Styles of Paul Richaud
- Reference style: His Eminence
- Spoken style: Your Eminence
- Informal style: Cardinal
- See: Bordeaux

Paul-Marie-André Richaud (16 April 1887 – 5 February 1968) was a French Cardinal of the Roman Catholic Church. He was Archbishop of Bordeaux from 1950 until his death, and was elevated to the cardinalate in 1958.

== Biography ==
Paul Richaud was born in Versailles, and there attended the major seminary before going to Rome to study at the Pontifical Gregorian University. Ordained to the priesthood on 28 June 1913, he then finished his studies in 1915 at the Pontifical University of St. Thomas Aquinas, Angelicum where he obtained a doctorate in philosophy. Richaud did pastoral work in Versailles until 1931, when he became its Vicar General and Vice-Assistant General of the French Catholic Action.

On 19 December 1933 Richaud was appointed Auxiliary Bishop of Versailles and Titular Bishop of Irenopolis in Isauria by Pope Pius XI. He received his episcopal consecration on 25 January 1934 from Bishop Benjamin Roland-Gosselin, with Bishops Pierre-Marie Gerlier and Georges Louis. Richaud was later named Bishop of Laval on 27 July 1938, and Archbishop of Bordeaux on 10 February 1950.

Pope John XXIII created him Cardinal Priest of Santi Quirico e Giulitta in the consistory of 15 December 1958. During his tenure at Bordeaux, Richaud expanded parochial schools and gave the laity a more prominent role. He attended the Second Vatican Council from 1962 to 1965, and was one of the cardinal electors who participated in the 1963 papal conclave that selected Pope Paul VI.

The Cardinal died from a liver ailment in Bordeaux, at age 80. He is buried in Bordeaux Cathedral.

He greatly encouraged Scouting in France.

== See also ==
Catholic Church titles
Preceded by Joseph Marcadé	Bishop of Laval; 1938–1950	Succeeded by Maurice Rousseau
Preceded by Maurice Feltin	Archbishop of Bordeaux; 1950–1968	Succeeded by Marius Maziers
