= Laval Cathedral =

Cathedral located in Laval, Mayenne, France

Coordinates: 48°4′5″N 0°46′25″W

Laval Cathedral Cathédrale de la Sainte-Trinité de Laval
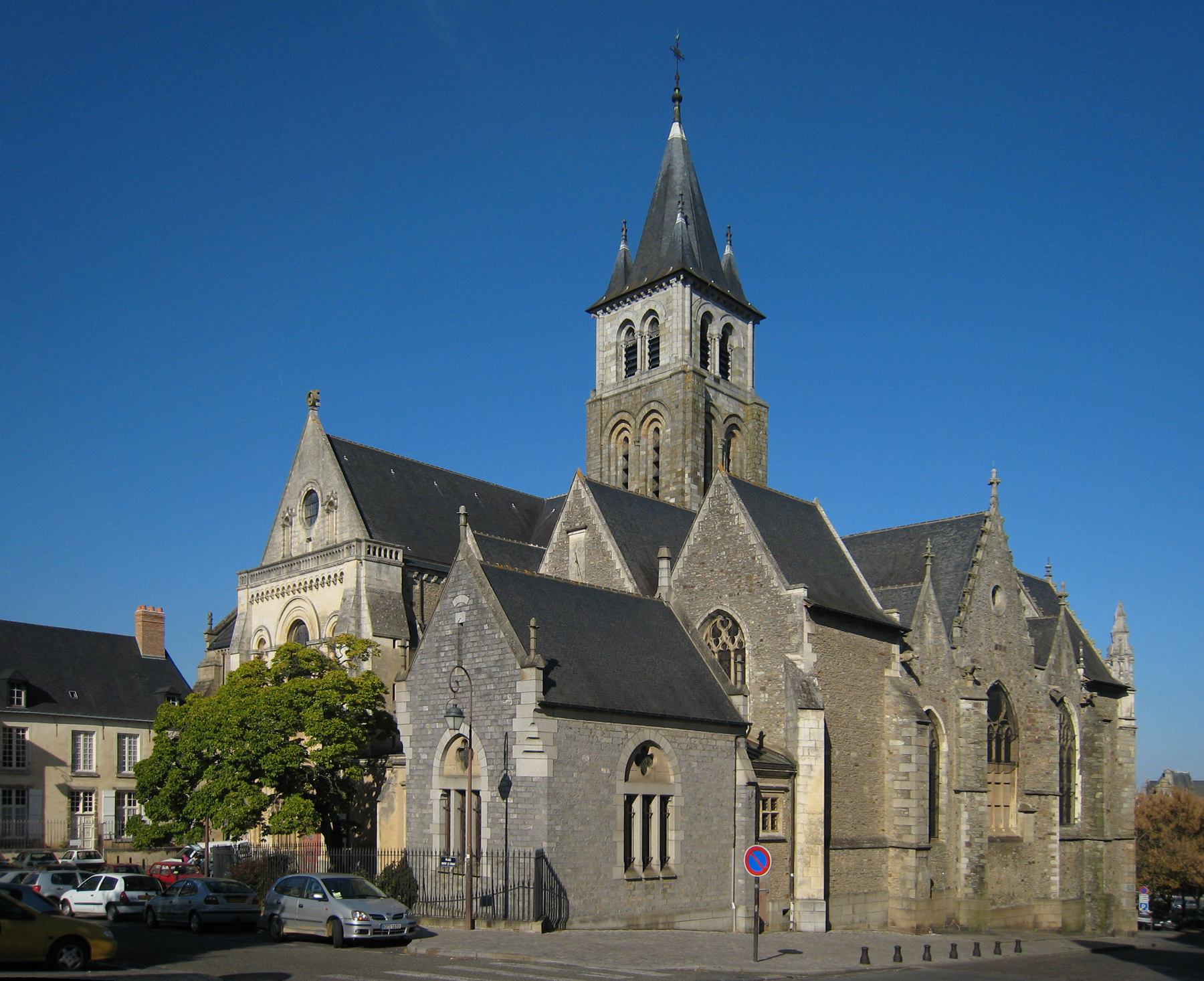
- Laval Cathedral

Religion
- Affiliation: Roman Catholic Church
- Province: Diocese of Laval
- Region: Mayenne
- Rite: Roman
- Ecclesiastical or organisational status: Cathedral
- Status: Active

Location
- Location: Laval, France
- Interactive map of Laval Cathedral; Cathédrale de la Sainte-Trinité de Laval

Architecture
- Type: church
- Style: Romanesque, Gothic
- Groundbreaking: 11th century
- Completed: 19th century

Laval Cathedral (French: Cathédrale de la Sainte-Trinité de Laval) is a Roman Catholic church and a national monument in Laval, France. The cathedral has been listed since 1840 as a monument historique by the French Ministry of Culture. Since the establishment of the Diocese of Laval in 1855, it has been its cathedral. The building dates back to the 11th century, but has been much altered and expanded in the 12th, 15th, 16th and 19th centuries.
