= Jean Honoré =

His Eminence Jean Marcel Honoré
- Cardinal, Archbishop emeritus of Tours
- Church: Catholic Church
- Archdiocese: Tours
- Appointed: 13 August 1981
- Term ended: 22 July 1997
- Predecessor: Louis Henri Marie Ferrand
- Successor: Michel Paul Marie Moutel
- Other post: Cardinal-Priest of Santa Maria della Salute a Primavalle
- Previous post: Bishop of Evreux (1972-1981)

Orders
- Ordination: 29 June 1943
- Consecration: 17 December 1972 by Paul Joseph Marie Gouyon
- Created cardinal: 21 February 2001 by John Paul II
- Rank: Cardinal-Priest

Personal details
- Born: Jean Marcel Honoré; 13 August 1920 Saint-Brice-en-Coglès, France
- Died: 28 February 2013 (aged 92) Tours
- Denomination: Catholic
- Motto: cor ad cor loquitur
- Coat of arms

Jean Marcel Honoré (13 August 1920 – 28 February 2013) was a cardinal of the Roman Catholic Church and a former archbishop of Tours. He was born in Saint-Brice-en-Coglès.

He was ordained on 29 June 1943 after studying at the seminary in Rennes, and from 1958 to 1964 was secretary general of the National Commission for Religious Education and director of the National Centre of Religious Teaching. He was made Bishop of Évreux in 1972 and Archbishop of Tours in 1981. Honoré was known as a specialist in the works of Cardinal Newman.

In 1990, Honoré recognized the Little Sisters Disciples of the Lamb as a public association of the Christian faithful. He went on to promote the group's cause in Rome.

Honoré retired as Archbishop of Tours in 1997 at the age of 76. Honoré was created cardinal by Pope John Paul II in 2001. Honoré died on 28 February 2013.
