= Bourge =

Bourge is a surname. Notable people with the surname include:

- Pierre Bourge (1921–2013), French astronomer
  - 13674 Bourge, a main-belt asteroid
- Tony Bourge (born 1948), Welsh guitarist best known as a member of Budgie

== See also ==
- Borge (surname)
- Bourges (disambiguation)
