= Ressiana (North Africa) =

Location of Ressiana

Ressiana is an ancient Roman city of the province of Numidia in present in what is now Algeria and a smaller part of Tunisia, North Africa. The city was the seat of a bishopric, which exists now only as a titular see. Bishop Franc Šuštar, auxiliary bishop of Ljubljana is the current titular bishop.

== Bishops ==
- 1948–2003 Adalbert Boros
- 2003–2008 John Michael Quinn
- 2008–2015 Jean-Pierre Batut
- since 2015 Franc Šuštar
