= Little Sisters Disciples of the Lamb =

Roman Catholic religious institute for women based in France

- Les Petites Soeurs Disciples de l'Agneau
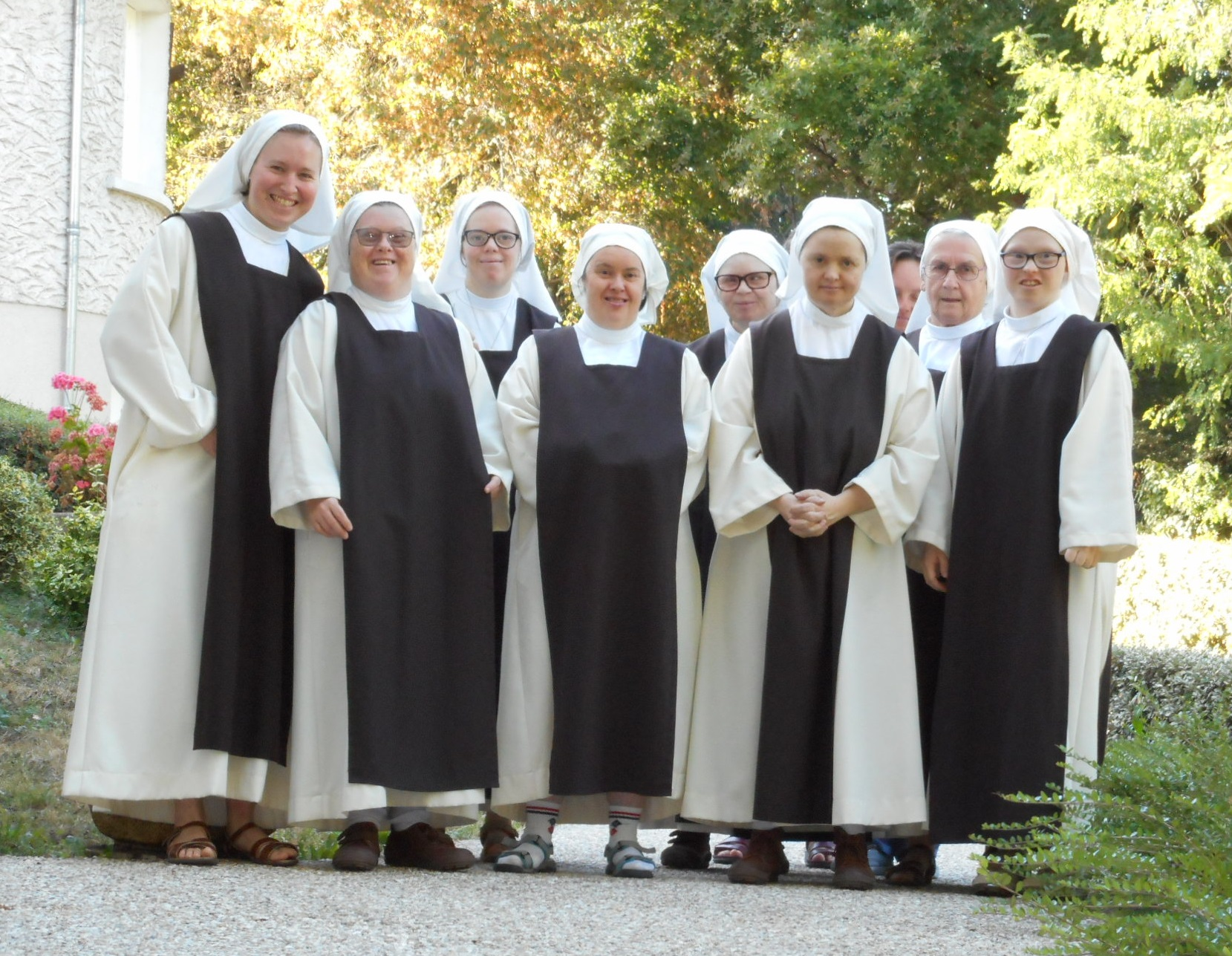
- Little Sisters Disciples of the Lamb
- Formation: 1985; 41 years ago
- Mother Prioress: Mother Line
- Website: www.les-petites-soeurs-disciples-de-lagneau.com/en/

The Little Sisters Disciples of the Lamb (French: Les Petites Soeurs Disciples de l'Agneau) is a Roman Catholic religious institute for women based in France. It is the world's first contemplative community to welcome those with Down syndrome into the consecrated life.

== History ==
The Little Sisters was founded in 1985 by now-Mother Prioress Line when she befriended Véronique, a girl with Down syndrome. The group was assisted by Jerome Lejeune, a French pediatrician and geneticist, best known for discovering the chromosome abnormality that causes Down syndrome. Véronique wanted to join a religious community but was denied because those she approached could not accommodate her needs. Line and Véronique moved into a small apartment in a council house in the village of Buxeuil to begin their community. By 1990, another girl with Down syndrome joined them and they asked Archbishop Jean Honoré to recognize the group as a public association of the Christian faithful. He would later promote the association before Vatican officials.

In 1995, the group had outgrown their space and so moved to Le Blanc where they were welcomed by Archbishop Pierre Plateau. With Plateau's support, the group obtained the status of a contemplative religious institute in 1999. With the intervention of Archbishop Armand Maillard, they obtained the definitive recognition of their statutes in 2011 by Pope Benedict XVI.

== Little Sisters today ==
As of 2019, there are ten Little Sisters Disciples of the Lamb, eight of whom have Down Syndrome. The group follows the Little Way of Saint Thérèse of Lisieux. Before being admitted to the community, all women, with Down Syndrome or not, must undergo a period of discernment. Following that is one year postulancy and three years of novitiate. Temporary vows are then taken for three years and are followed by a final profession.

The sisters' daily lives consist of prayer, work, and sacrifice. Mass is held every Tuesday in their chapel, and the sisters engage in weaving, pottery, and tending to a garden of medicinal plants. Their convent is near Fontgombault Abbey and a monk from the Abbey serves as their chaplain. They have a special relationship with the monks of Clear Creek Abbey.
