= Étienne-Jean-Baptiste-Louis des Gallois de La Tour =

- Archbishop of Bourges
- Church: Roman Catholic Church
- Archdiocese: Bourges
- See: Bourges
- Appointed: 8 August 1817
- Installed: 1 October 1817
- Term ended: 20 March 1820
- Predecessor: Marie-Charles-Isidore de Mercy
- Successor: Jean-Marie Cliquet de Fontenay
- Previous posts: Bishop of Moulins (1788-90); Vicar General of the Diocese of Autun (1785-88); Abbot of Blanche-Couronne (1774-1790)

Orders
- Ordination: 19 April 1873
- Consecration: 26 September 1819

Personal details
- Born: Étienne-Jean-Baptiste-Louis des Gallois de La Tour; 2 June 1750 Aix-en-Provence
- Died: 20 March 1820 (aged 69) Bourges, French Third Republic

Étienne Jean-Baptiste Louis des Gallois de La Tour (2 June 1750 – 20 March 1820) was Bishop of Moulins before emigrating, then Archbishop of Bourges under the Restoration.

== Biography ==
He was the eldest son of Charles Jean-Baptiste des Gallois de La Tour (1717-1802), intendant of the Generality of Provence and first president of the parliament of Aix-en-Provence, and Marie-Madeleine d'Aligre; he is also the nephew of Etienne François d'Aligre.

He was a councillor in the parliament of Aix, then commendatory abbot of the royal abbey of Notre-Dame de Blanche-Couronne in 1774, prior and count of Perrecy.

Abbé de Latour was ordained a priest on 19 April 1783. He became vicar general of the diocese of Autun in the district of Moulins and dean of the collegiate church of Notre-Dame de Moulins in October 1785. He was appointed bishop of the new diocese of Moulins in October 1788.

During the Revolution, he was solicited by the Directory of Allier, but he refused to ask for the canonical institution and emigrated in 1790 to England and then to Italy. During his exile, he was chaplain to Madame Adélaïde and Madame Victoire de France until their deaths in Trieste in 1799. He also ministered to the French prisoners of war at the Norman Cross Prison.

On his return to France, he was appointed Archbishop of Bourges on 8 August 1817, advocated on 1 October 1817 and consecrated archbishop on 26 September 1819.
