= Louis-Victor-Emile Bougaud =

French writer and preacher

- Bishop of Laval
- Church: Catholic Church
- Diocese: Diocese of Laval
- In office: 25 November 1887 – 7 November 1888
- Predecessor: Victor Maréchal
- Successor: Jules Cléret

Orders
- Ordination: 6 June 1846
- Consecration: 3 February 1888 by Pierre-Hector Coullié

Personal details
- Born: 25 February 1823 Dijon, Côte-d'Or, Kingdom of France
- Died: 7 November 1888 (aged 65) Laval, Mayenne, French Republic

Émile Bougaud, born Edme Louis Victor Bougaud (b. at Dijon, 25 February 1823, d. at Laval, 7 November 1888) was French, known as a writer and preacher. He became Bishop of Laval.

He was an influential writer, aiming to reconcile his contemporaries with Catholic teaching.

== Life ==
He received his classical education at Autun, where his professor of rhetoric was Jean-Baptiste-François Pitra. He studied theology at Dijon and Paris, was ordained priest by Denis Auguste Affre in 1846, was professor of church history at the Seminary of Dijon (1846–51), and then chaplain of the Convent of the Visitation in the same city (1851–61).

In 1861 he accepted the position of Vicar-General to Félix Dupanloup at Orléans. In 1886, he was appointed Bishop of Laval.

== Works ==
Besides the sermons which he delivered in Paris and other cities, Bougaud wrote numerous works. While chaplain of the Visitation Convent, he wrote:

- Étude sur la mission, les actes et le culte de saint Bénigne
- Histoire de sainte Chantal

While Vicar-General of Orléans, he wrote:

- Histoire de sainte Monique
- Histoire de la bienheureuse Marguerite Marie
- Le Christianisme et les temps présents (his great apologetical work, in 5 vols.)
- Le grand péril de l'Église de France au XIXe siècle
- Histoire de saint Vincent de Paul (2 vols.)

A volume of his discourses was published by his brother.

== Sources ==
Attribution

The entry cites

- F. Lagrange, "Notice historique sur Mgr Louis-Émile Bougaud évêque de Laval", Discours de Monseigneur Bougaud évêque de Laval publiés par son frère et précédés d’une notice historique par M. l’abbé F. Lagrange Chanoine de Notre-Dame, Vicaire général d’Orléans, Paris, Poussielgue frères, 1889, p. [I]-LXX.
- Semaine Religieuse de Laval (1888).
