= Diocese of Laval =

Latin Catholic diocese in France

Coordinates: 48°04′07″N 0°46′43″W

Diocese of Laval Dioecesis Valleguidonensis Diocèse de Laval

Catholic
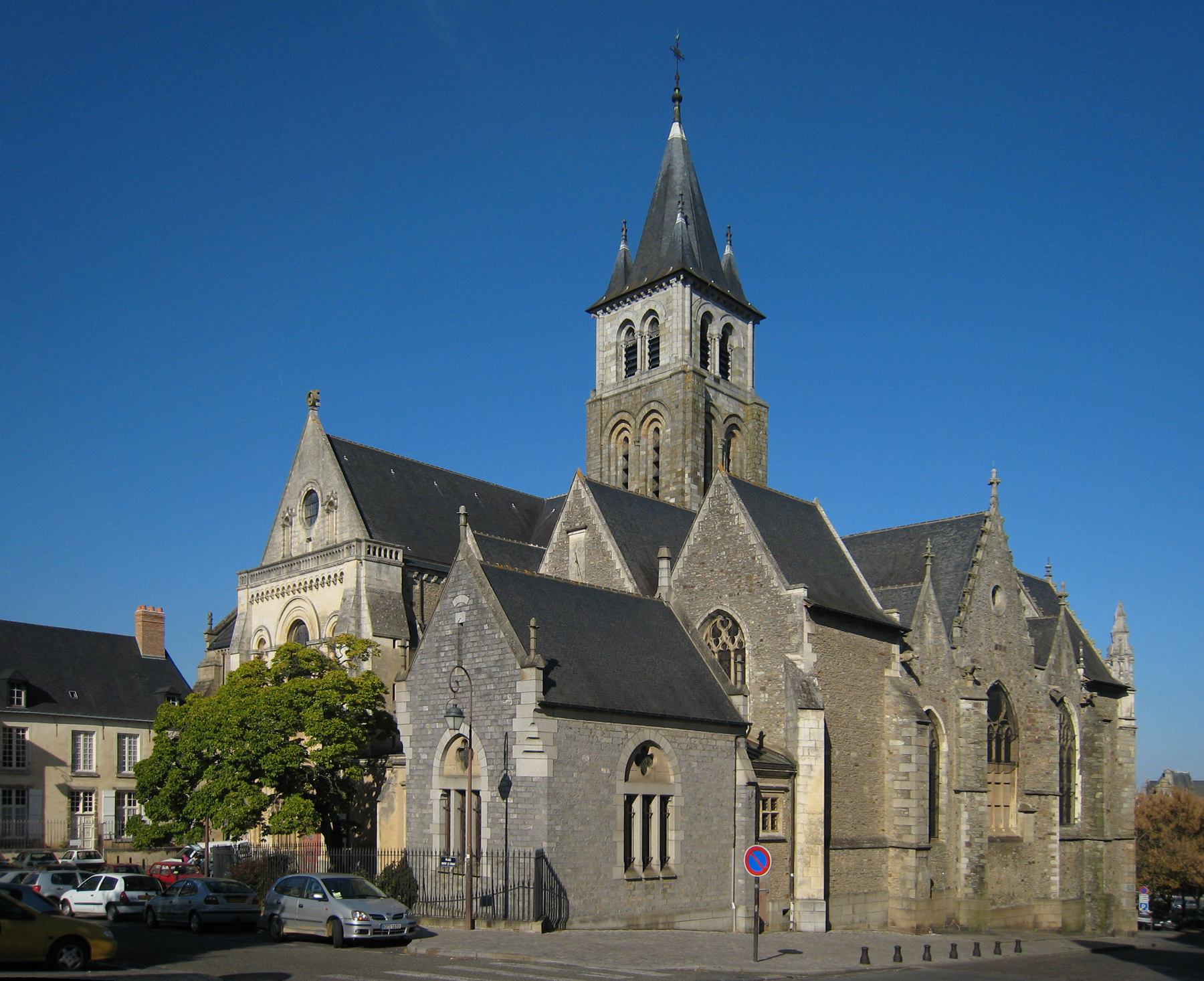
- Laval Cathedral

Location
- Country: France
- Ecclesiastical province: Rennes
- Metropolitan: Archdiocese of Rennes

Statistics
- Area: 5,175 km^{2} (1,998 sq mi)
- Population: Total; Catholics: (as of 2021); 307,084; 282,200 (est.) (91.9%)
- Parishes: 31 'new parishes'

Information
- Denomination: Catholic Church
- Sui iuris church: Latin Church
- Rite: Roman Rite
- Established: 30 June 1855
- Cathedral: Cathedral of the Holy Trinity in Laval
- Patron saint: Immaculate Conception
- Secular priests: 59 (Diocesan); 51 (Religious Orders); 23 Permanent Deacons

Current leadership
- Pope: Leo XIV
- Bishop: Matthieu Dupont
- Metropolitan Archbishop: Pierre d'Ornellas

Map

Website
- Website of the Diocese (in French)

The Diocese of Laval (Latin: Dioecesis Valleguidonensis; French: Diocèse de Laval) is a Latin Church ecclesiastical territory or diocese of the Catholic Church in France. The episcopal see is Laval Cathedral in the city of Laval. Created in June 1855, the diocese was originally erected from the Diocese of Le Mans, and corresponds to the department of Mayenne. Under the Ancien Régime the diocese of Mans had an Archdeacon of Laval, whose responsibilities extended over the deaneries of Ernée, Évrun, Laval and Mayenne. The diocese is a suffragan in the ecclesiastical province of the metropolitan Archdiocese of Rennes. The current bishop is Matthieu Dupont, appointed in 2024.

In 2023, in the Diocese of Laval there was one priest for every 2,729 Catholics.

== History ==
At the beginning of the Revolution, the Constituent Assembly decided that the number of dioceses in France was excessive, and that approximately fifty of them could be eliminated. Those that survived would have their boundaries changed to coincide with new departmental subdivisions of France. This was contrary to Canon Law, which reserved the creation and suppression of dioceses, as well as the appointment and transfer (translation) of bishops to the Pope. In creating the new department of Mayenne, the French government produced a territory in which there was no established bishopric. The very large former diocese of Mans (now called Sarthe) was divided, and the western half given to the diocese of Mayenne, situated at Laval. A new Metropolitanate was created (the Métropole du Nord-Ouest), with its center at Rennes, embracing the department-dioceses of Ille-et-Vilaine, Côtes du Nord, Finistère, Loire-Inférieure, Maine-et-Loire, Mayenne, Morbihan, and Sarthe.

=== Bishop of Mayenne ===
In March 1791 the electors of the Department of Mayenne met to elect a constitutional bishop. These electors did not need to be active members of the Roman Catholic Church, nor even Christians. The election, therefore, was blasphemous and schismatic. The office of bishop was first offered to Abbé de Vauponts, the Vicar General of the (former) diocese of Dol. After some hesitation, he refused, and won a commendation from Pope Pius VI. On 20 March, the electors then turned to Father Noel-Gabriel-Luce Villar, a native of Toulouse and teacher of rhetoric at the Collège de Toulouse, and then principal of the Collège de la Flèche. He was consecrated in Paris by the Constitutional Bishop Jean-Baptiste Gobel on 22 May 1791. Gobel had been consecrated titular Bishop of Lydda in 1772, and therefore the consecration of Villar was valid, though uncanonical and schismatic. The new bishop returned to Laval, and was installed in the church of la Trinité, which served as a cathedral for the Constitutionals. Only twenty-two ecclesiastics signed the record. Villar participated in the Legislative Assembly, and voted King Louis XVI guilty, though not requiring the death penalty. In 1794, when Reason replaced Religion in France, he abandoned his ecclesiastical activities and no longer said Mass. He did not resign his bishopric, however, until 3 October 1798, under pressure from his Metropolitan, Bishop Le Coz. He died on 26 August 1826.

In October 1798 Bishop Le Coz was able to authorize an election, by the priests of Mayenne, to provide a successor to Bishop Villar. They chose Charles François Dorlodot (or D'Orlodot), the curé of the church of S. Vénérand in Laval, and Bishop Le Coz confirmed the election on 6 February 1799. Dorlodot was consecrated at Laval by Le Coz and the constitutional bishops of Saint-Brieuc and Vannes on 7 April 1799. He took part in the provincial council held by Le Coz in Rennes, and then in the national council held in Paris in 1800.

=== Restoration of papal control ===
On November 29, 1801, by the bull Qui Christi Domini, Pope Pius VII suppressed all of the Roman Catholic dioceses in France, and reinstituted them under papal authority. The Constitutional Diocese of Mayenne (Laval) was ignored by the Vatican, which had played no part in its existence. In 1802 the French government suppressed the diocese of Mayenne (Laval), and Dordolot was named a Canon of Mans. He continued to reside in Laval, however, and found employment as librarian of the École Central until 1810, when he followed his patron Le Coz to Besançon. He died in Besançon on 3 January 1816.

=== The diocese ===
A memorial, arguing the benefits of a new diocese, prepared by Guillaume-François d'Ozouville, was presented to the mayor and council of Laval as early as 1841, which, in due course, was submitted to the departmental Prefect. In 1846 the creation of the new diocese was decided upon, but the revolution of 1848, which ended the monarchy, and replaced it with a Constituent Assembly, postponed further action. Pope Pius IX was also expelled from Rome by a republican revolution in November 1848, and sought refuge in Gaeta in the kingdom of Naples; he did not return until 1853. In December 1849, the ecclesiastical provincial council met in Rennes, and was informed of the plans for a diocese at Laval. Bishop Jean-Baptiste Bouvier of Le Mans objected and opposed the plan, and nothing was accomplished until after his death, on 29 December 1854. On 5 May 1855, a law was passed, authorizing the creation of a new diocese, and granting a temporary governmental subsidy of 40,000 francs. A Bull of Pope Pius IX, June 30, 1855, established the See of Laval. The new diocese was a suffragan of the archdiocese of Tours. The new bishop, Casimir Wicart, transferred from the diocese of Fréjus, made his solemn entry into the diocese and enthronement on 28 September 1855, in a ceremony presided over by the papal nuncio to France, Carlo Sacconi, titular archbishop of Nicaea.

==== Chapter and cathedral ====
The already-existing parish church of Sainte-Trinité in Laval was designated by Pius IX to be the new cathedral of the diocese. It was to be served and administered by a Chapter, consisting of ten canons, three of whom were dignitiess: the curé, the theologus, and the penitentiarius. Provision was also made for an unlimited number of honorary canons, who however did not have voting rights in the Chapter. The cathedral remained a parish church as well, with one of the canons serving as curé.

The apologist Emile Bougaud was consecrated Bishop of Laval in February 1888, and died a few months later. The demand of the Holy See in 1904 for the resignation of Bishop Pierre-Joseph Geay (1896-1904), without consultation with the French government, was one of the reasons given by the French Republic for nullifying the Concordat, breaking with the pope, and preparing the separation of Church and State.

In August 1859 Bishop Casimir-Alexis-Joseph Wicart held a diocesan synod in the église S. Michel in Laval. Bishop Grellier held a synod in November 1913.

== Bishops of Laval ==
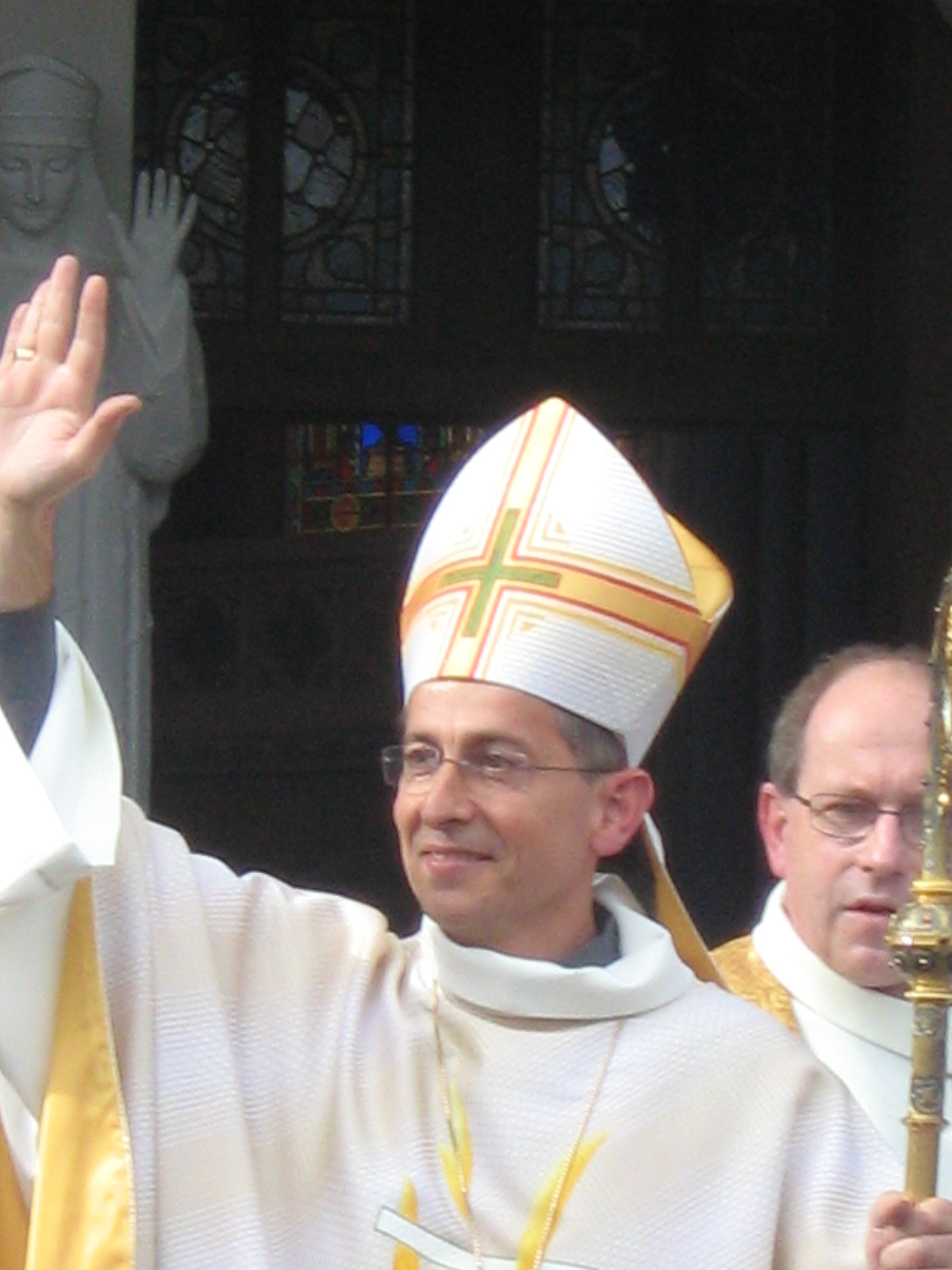
Bishop Thierry Scherrer

- (1855–1876) : Casimir-Alexis-Joseph Wicart
- (1876–1886) : Jules-Denis-Marie-Dieudonné Le Hardy du Marais
- (1887–1887) : Victor Maréchal
- (1887–1888) : Louis-Victor-Emile Bougaud
- (1889–1895) : Jules Cléret
- (1896–1904) : Pierre-Joseph Geay
- (1906–1936) : Eugène-Jacques Grellier
- (1936–1938) : Joseph-Jean-Yves Marcadé
- (1938–1950) : Paul-Marie-André Richaud
- (1950–1962) : Maurice-Paul-Jules Rousseau
- (1962–1969) : Charles-Marie-Jacques Guilhem
- (1969–1984) : Paul-Louis Carrière
- (1984–1995) : Louis-Marie Billé
- (1996–2007) : Armand Maillard
- (2008–2023) : Thierry Scherrer
- (2024 – ) : Matthieu Dupont

== Bibliography ==
- Ritzler, Remigius; Sefrin, Pirminus (1968). Hierarchia Catholica medii et recentioris aevi sive summorum pontificum, S. R. E. cardinalium, ecclesiarum antistitum series... A pontificatu Pii PP. VII (1800) usque ad pontificatum Gregorii PP. XVI (1846) (in Latin). Vol. VII. Monasterii: Libr. Regensburgiana.
- Remigius Ritzler; Pirminus Sefrin (1978). Hierarchia catholica Medii et recentioris aevi... A Pontificatu PII PP. IX (1846) usque ad Pontificatum Leonis PP. XIII (1903) (in Latin). Vol. VIII. Il Messaggero di S. Antonio.
- Pięta, Zenon (2002). Hierarchia catholica medii et recentioris aevi... A pontificatu Pii PP. X (1903) usque ad pontificatum Benedictii PP. XV (1922) (in Latin). Vol. IX. Padua: Messagero di San Antonio. ISBN 978-88-250-1000-8.

=== Studies ===
- Boullier, Isidore (1846). Mémoires ecclésiastiques concernant la ville de Laval et ses environs: diocèse du Mans, pendant la révolution de 1789 à 1802 (in French). Laval: H. Godbert.
- Couanier de Launay, Etienne-Louis (1888). Vie de Mgr C. Wicart, premier évêque de Laval et Histoire de l'érection de cet évêché. (in French). Laval: Chailland 1888.
- Denis, Michel (1967). L'église et la République en Mayenne: 1896-1906 (in French). Rennes: Inst. de Recherches Historiques de Rennes.
- Pisani Paul (1907). Répertoire biographique de l'épiscopat constitutionnel (1791-1802) (in French). Paris: A. Picard et fils.
- Religious Establishment of the French Republic: being the Concordat ratified between the Pope and the French Government (10 Sept. 1801); with the official report of Citizen Portalis to the Legislative Body, etc. London: J. S. Jordan. 1802.
- Sévestre, Émile (1905). L'histoire, le texte et la destinée du Concordat de 1801 (in French) (second ed.). Paris: Lethielleux.
- Société bibliographique (France) (1907). L'épiscopat français depuis le Concordat jusqu'à la Séparation (1802-1905). Paris: Librairie des Saints-Pères.

=== External links ===
- (in French) Centre national des Archives de l'Église de France, L’Épiscopat francais depuis 1919, retrieved: 2016-12-24.
- (in French) Diocese of Laval official website
- (in English) "Diocese of Laval". Catholic-Hierarchy.org. David M. Cheney.
