= Archdiocese of Bourges =

Catholic archdiocese in France

Coordinates: 47°04′49″N 2°23′51″E

Archdiocese of Bourges Archidioecesis Bituricensis Archidiocèse de Bourges

Catholic
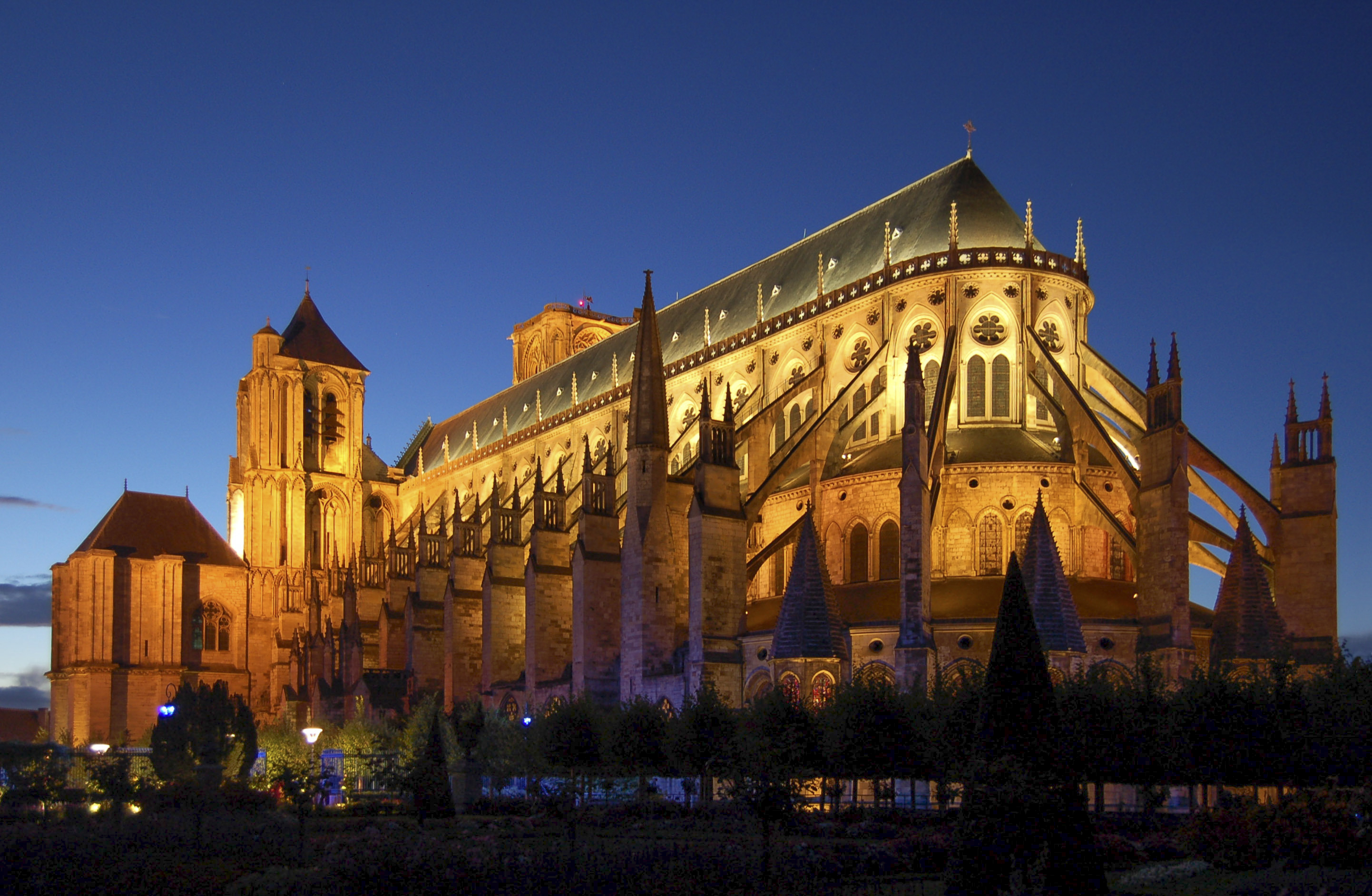
- Bourges Cathedral

Location
- Country: France
- Ecclesiastical province: Tours
- Metropolitan: Archdiocese of Tours

Statistics
- Area: 14,210 km^{2} (5,490 sq mi)
- Population: Total; Catholics: (as of 2022); 533,000 (est.); 500,000 (est.)
- Parishes: 58

Information
- Denomination: Catholic
- Sui iuris church: Latin Church
- Rite: Roman Rite
- Established: 3rd Century
- Cathedral: Cathedral of St. Stephen in Bourges
- Patron saint: St. Ursinus of Bourges
- Secular priests: 66 (Diocesan); 19 (Religious Orders); 18 Permanent Deacons

Current leadership
- Pope: Leo XIV
- Archbishop: Sylvain Bataille
- Metropolitan Archbishop: Vincent Jordy
- Bishops emeritus: Hubert Barbier; Armand Maillard

Map

Website
- www.diocese-bourges.org

The Archdiocese of Bourges (Latin: Archidioecesis Bituricensis; French: Archidiocèse de Bourges) is a Latin Church archdiocese of the Catholic Church in France. The Archdiocese comprises the départements of Cher and Indre in the Region of Val de Loire. Bourges Cathedral, dedicated to Saint Stephen (French: Étienne), stands in the city of Bourges in the department of Cher. Although this is still titled as an Archdiocese, it ceased as a metropolitan see in 2002 and is now a suffragan in the ecclesiastical province of Tours.

== History ==
The diocese was founded in the 3rd century. Its first bishop was Ursinus of Bourges.

The ecclesiastical province of Aquitaine was substantially modified from the late Roman province of Aquitania Prima with which it initially corresponded. Bourges was a metropolitan by the beginning of the 6th century. Bishop Honoratus of Bourges presided at the Council of Clermont on 8 November 535. By the end of the 7th century, the ecclesiastical province of Bourges included the dioceses of Albi, Cahors, Clermont, Gabalitana (Javols), Limoges, Rodez, Toulouse, and Aniciensis (Le Puy). In the Middle Ages there was a running dispute between the bishop of Bourges and the bishop of Bordeaux about the primacy of Aquitaine and the extent of the jurisdiction of the metropolitans.

The archbishop of Bourges enjoyed primatial (patriarchal) jurisdiction over the ecclesiastical provinces of Narbonne, Auch, Bordeaux, and Toulouse; to which was later added Albi, when it became an archbishopric. As metropolitan, the archbishop enjoyed jurisdiction over the dioceses of Clermont, S. Flour, Le Puy, Limoges, and Tulle.

=== Synods ===
A diocesan synod was an irregularly held, but important, meeting of the bishop of a diocese and his clergy. Its purpose was (1) to proclaim generally the various decrees already issued by the bishop; (2) to discuss and ratify measures on which the bishop chose to consult with his clergy; (3) to publish statutes and decrees of the diocesan synod, of the provincial synod, and of the Holy See.

Bourges was the location of many synods. The synods of 30 November 1225, presided over by the papal legate Cardinal Romanus Bonaventura, and 1226 are the most important and dealt with the Albigenses. The council of 18 November 1228, presided over by Archbishop Simon de Sully (1218–1232) approved the suspension of the archbishop of Bordeaux, Géraud de Malemort (1227–1261), from his metropolitan status. Another council was held in 1276, another in 1286, and in 1336. Archbishop Jean Coeur held a synod in 1451. In 1516, Archbishop Antoine Bohier (1514–1519) held a synod. A synod took place in 1528, against Martin Luther and his teachings. Archbishop Jacques le Roy (1537–1572) published synodial constitutions in 1541. In September 1584, in accordance with the decrees of the Council of Trent, Archbishop Renaud de Beaune (1581–1602) held a provincial synod in Bourges, and published the statutes. The meeting had been postponed for some time due to the plague. On 23 October 1608, Archbishop André Fremiot (1602–1622) presided over a diocesan synod in Bourges, and published the decrees and statutes. Other synods were held in 1643, 1645, 1652, 1662, 1673, 1676, and 1680. Archbishop Frédéric Jérôme de La Rochefoucauld (1729–1757) held a synod on 3 October 1738, others on 16 April and 22 October 1739, others on 5 May and 20 October 1740, another on 20 April 1741, others on 12 April and 25 October 1742, others on 9 May and 24 October 1743, and another on 23 May 1744. He published its statutes, along with citations from earlier councils and synods.

On 6 October 1850, Cardinal Archbishop Jacques-Marie Dupont (1842–1859) held a provincial council in Clermont, attended by the bishops of Clermont-Ferrand, Saint-Flour, Tulle, Limoges, and Le Puy-en-Velay. Councils had been ordered in all of the ecclesiastical provinces of France by Pope Pius IX, who had been driven out of Rome and replaced by a republican government. They were expected to act to protect orthodoxy and obedience, and to reject the ideals of the revolutions.

In the 14th century, the ecclesiastical province of which Bourges was the metropolitan included the dioceses of: Albi (5th cent.), Castres (1317), Cahors, Clermont, Saint-Flour (1317), Limoges, Mende, Rodez, Tulle (1317), and Vabres (1317). In the papal bull "Triumphans Pastor" issued by Pope Innocent XI on 3 October 1678, the diocese of Albi was promoted to the rank and status of metropolitan archbishopric, and assigned as suffragans (subordinates) the dioceses of Castres, Cahors, Mende, Rodez, and Vabres; this left the metropolitan archbishopric of Bourges with the dioceses of Clermont, Saint-Flour, Limoges, and Tulle.

On the eve of the Feast of the Ascension in 1467, nearly the entire city of Bourges was consumed in a fire.

=== Chapter and cathedral ===
On 16 May 1559, a fire destroyed part of the cathedral of Saint-Étienne.

The cathedral was staffed and administered by a corporation of clerics called the Chapter. The Chapter was headed by a dean and thirteen other dignitaries: the Cantor, the Chancellor, the Archdeacon, the Subcantor, the eight archdeacons, and the archpriest. Pope Urban III (1185–1187) increased the number of prebends from thirty to forty. Pope Clement III (1187–1191) confirmed the decree, and stipulated that forty should be the number of canons, both residentiary and non-residentiary together. There were thirty canons in the 17th century. In 1757, when king Louis XV dissolved the Sainte-Chapelle of the palace in Bourges, he reserved for himself, with the consent of the Chapter, the right to appoint to fourteen of the canonries of the cathedral. By virtue of a bull of Pope Honorius II of 27 December 1130, if a prebend was vacant for more than six months, the archbishop had the right to appoint to it.

Canons were already in existence by 903, though they had abandoned the practice of living in common by 1215.

Two canons of Bourges later became pope: Ubaldo Allocingoli, who became Pope Lucius III (1180–1185); and Umberto Crivelli, who was also an archdeacon of Bourges and became Pope Urban III (1185–1187). Pierre Roger de Beaufort, who became Pope Gregory XI (1370–1378), was also an archdeacon of Bourges.

In 1236, on the motion of Archbishop Philippe Berruyer (1232–1260), the Chapter instituted the rule that no one could become a canon who was not the product of a legitimate marriage, or who was of a servile condition (slave or serf).

=== French Revolution ===
On 2 November 1789, the National Assembly proclaimed that all ecclesiastical property was confiscated by the State.

Even before it directed its attention to the Church directly, the National Constituent Assembly attacked the institution of monasticism. On 13 February 1790. it issued a decree which stated that the government would no longer recognize solemn religious vows taken by either men or women. In consequence, Orders and Congregations which lived under a Rule were suppressed in France. Members of either sex were free to leave their monasteries or convents if they wished, and could claim an appropriate pension by applying to the local municipal authority.

The National Constituent Assembly ordered the replacement of political subdivisions of the ancien régime with subdivisions called "departments", to be characterized by a single administrative city in the center of a compact area. The decree was passed on 22 December 1789, and the boundaries fixed on 26 February 1790, with the effective date of 4 March 1790. A new department was created called "Cher," and Bourges became the administrative city in the department.

The National Constituent Assembly then, on 6 February 1790, instructed its ecclesiastical committee to prepare a plan for the reorganization of the clergy. At the end of May, its work was presented as a draft Civil Constitution of the Clergy, which, after vigorous debate, was approved on 12 July 1790. There was to be one diocese in each department, requiring the suppression of approximately fifty dioceses. The diocese of Bourges was named the diocese of the department of Cher. A new arrangement of dioceses into metropolitanates was ordered, and Bourges became the metropolitan of the "Metropole du centre," with seven suffragan dioceses.

The Civil Constitution of the Clergy also abolished Chapters, canonries, prebends, and other offices both in cathedras and in collegiate churches. It also abolished chapters in abbeys and priories of either sex, whether regular or secular. On 12 July 1790, by decree of the Constituent Assembly, the cathedral Chapter of Bourges was abolished. Shortly thereafter, on 4 January 1791, Archbishop Chastenet de Puységur refused to take the obligatory oath to the Civil Constitution, and was obliged to leave the diocese in fear of his life; he sought refuge in London and then in Germany. His episcopal seat was declared vacant.

On 20 March 1790, the electors of the department of Cher met at Bourges and elected Charrier de la Roche, a canon of Lyon, as their constitutional bishop. The election was uncanonical and schismatic. He had lost the election for bishop of Paris, but had succeeded in the election for bishop of Rouen; when he chose Rouen over Bourges, the electors had to hold another election. On 11 April 1791, they chose Pierre-Anastase Tourné, a former canon of Orleans and preacher to the king. He issued frequent pastoral letters, in strong opposition to the king, and was elected to the Legislative Assembly. In Bourges, he ordained married men as priests, and on 12 November 1793, apostasized. On 4 January 1794, he himself married; he returned to his native Tarbes, and died on 14 January 1797. In 1798, through the influence of Henri Gregoire, constitutional bishop of Paris, Tourné was replaced by Michel-Joseph Dufraisse, a former Jesuit and vicar of the diocese of Clermont. He was consecrated in Paris on 28 October 1798. He was compelled to resign in October 1801, and died in September 1802.

=== Restoration ===
The French Directory fell in the coup engineered by Talleyrand and Napoleon on 10 November 1799. The coup resulted in the establishment of the French Consulate, with Napoleon as the First Consul. To advance his aggressive military foreign policy, he decided to make peace with the Catholic Church in France and with the Papacy. In the concordat of 1801 with Pope Pius VII, and in the enabling papal bull, "Qui Christi Domini", the constitutional diocese of Cher and all the other dioceses in France, were suppressed. This removed all the institutional contaminations and novelties introduced by the Constitutional Church, and voided all of the episcopal appointments of both authentic and constitutional bishops. The diocesan structure was then canonically re-established by the papal bull "Qui Christi Domini" of 29 November 1801, including the diocese of Bourges. The Concordat was registered as a French law on 8 April 1802.

=== The French monarchy and dioceses restored ===
Pope Pius VII had intended, in the bull "Commissa Nobis" of 27 July 1817, to restore the diocese of Nevers in accordance with the Concordat of 1817 with King Louis XVIII, but the French parliament had refused to ratify the concordat as law. On 6 October 1822, a revised version of the bull, now called "Paternae charitatis", was signed, and on demand of the king was enacted into French law in 1823. The territory of the diocese of Nevers was removed from the diocese of Bourges.

The dioceses of Orléans, Chartres, and Blois, which historically had been dependent on Sens, were attached to Paris, from which they passed to Bourges in the 1960s. The Archdiocese, along with the three above-mentioned sees, is now suffragan to the Archdiocese of Tours.

Historical ecclesiastical geography has here changed to correspond with France's new regions, much as diocesan and provincial boundaries from Napoleon's Concordat of 1801 onwards changed mainly in accordance with those of the Revolution's départements.

In 2002 it lost its metropolitan function.

== Bishops of Bourges ==
=== To 600 ===
Louis Duchesne, pp. 23–25, has shown that the dates of the bishops before the 9th century are quite unreliable, as is the order of the names.

- Ursinus of Bourges (3rd century)
- Sevitianus
- Aetherius
- Thecretus
- Marcellus
- Viator (337–354)
- Eleutherius (354–363)
- Pauper 363–377
- Palladius (377–384)
- Villicius (384–412)
- Avitus 412–431
- Palladius (II) 448–462
- Leo (453)
- Eulogius (462–469)
- Simplicius (472–480)
- Tetradius (c. 506–511)
- Ruricius 512–?
- Siagrius
- Humatus : ?–?
- Honoratus of Bourges
- Honoratus (II)
- Arcadius 537–549
- Desideratus (549–550)
- Probianus (552–559)
- Saint Félix 560–573
- Remedius
- Sulpicius (584–591)
- Eustasius 591–591
- Apollinaris (591?–611?)

=== From 600 to 1000 ===
- Austregisilus (612–624)
- Sulpicius (624–647)
- Vulfoledus (647– after 660)
- Ado (662–680)
- Agosenus (682–683)
- Roitio (696–736)
- Siginus (736–761)
- Leodarius
- Dedoatus
- Segoleneus
- David
- Bertholanus (c. 760)
- Hermenarius (c. 769)
- Stephanus
- Ermembertus (c. 788–791)
- Ebroinus (c. 810)
- Agilulfus (c. 829–840)
- Rodulfus (840–866)
- Wulfad (866–876)
- Frotharius (876–c. 893)
- Adicius (c. 891)
- Madalbert (900–910)
- Gerontius (910–948)
- Launus (948–955)
- Richard de Blois (955–969)
- Hugh of Blois (969–985)
- Dagbert (987–1013)

=== From 1000 to 1300 ===
- Gauzlin Capet (1013–1030)
- Aimo de Bourbon (1031–1071)
- Richardus (c. 1071–1078)

...

- Alberich of Reims (1136–1141)
- Pierre de La Chastre (1141–1171)
- Garin Gerardi (1174–1180)
- Henry de Sully (1183–1200)
- William of Donjeon (1200–09)
- Girard de Cros (1209–1218)
- Simon de Sully 1218–1232
- Philippe Berruyer 1232–1260
- Jean de Sully 1260–1271
- Guy de Sully 1276–1280
- Simon de Beaulieu 1281–1294
- Egidius Colonna 1295–1316

=== 1300 to 1600 ===
- Renault de la Porte 1316–1320
- Guillaume de Brosse 1321–1331
- Foucaud de Rochechouard 1331–1343
- Blessed Roger le Fort 1343–1367
- Pierre d'Estaing 1367–1370
- Pierre de Cros (1370–1374)
- Bertrand de Chenac (1374–1386)
- Jean de Rochechouart 1382–1390
- Pierre Aimery 1391–1409
- Guillaume de Boisratier 1409–1421
- Henry d'Avangour 1421–1446
- Jean Coeur 1446–1483
- Pierre Cadoüet 1483–1492
- Guillaume de Cambray 1492–1505
- Michel de Bucy 1505–1511
- Andrew Forman (1514)
- Antoine Bohier 1514–1519 (elevated to Cardinal in 1517)
- François de Tournon (1526–1537) (elevated to Cardinal in 1530)
- Jacques le Roy, O.S.B. (1537–1572)
- Antoine Vialart, O.S.B. (1572–1576)
- Renaud de Beaune (1581–1602)

=== From 1600 to 1900 ===
- André Fremiot (1602–1622)
- Roland Hébert (1622–1638)
- Pierre d'Hardivilliers (1639–1642–1649)
- Anne de Lévis de Ventadour (1651–1662)
- Jean de Montpezat de Carbon (1665–1675)
- Michel Poncet de La Rivière (1675–1677)
- Michel Phélypeaux de La Vrillière (1677–1694)
- Léon Potier de Gesvres (1694–1729)
- Frédéric Jérôme de La Rochefoucauld (1729–1757)
- Georges-Louis Phélypeaux d'Herbault (1757–1787)
- Jean-Antoine-Auguste de Chastenet de Puységur (1788–1801)
  –refused to resign; dismissed

Constitutional church (schismatic)

Pierre-Anastase Tourné (1791–1794)
Michel-Joseph Dufraisse (1798–1801)

- Marie-Charles-Isidore de Mercy (1802–1811)
- Étienne-Jean-Baptiste-Louis des Gallois de La Tour (1817–1820)
- Jean-Marie Cliquet de Fontenay (1820–1834)
- Guillaume-Aubin de Villèle (1825–1841)
- Jacques-Marie Antoine Célestin Dupont (1842–1859)
- Alexis-Basile-Alexandre Menjaud (1859–1861)
- Charles-Amable de la Tour d'Auvergne Lauraguais (1861–1879)
- Jean-Joseph Marchal (1880–1892)
- Jean-Pierre Boyer (1893–1896)

=== From 1900 to present ===
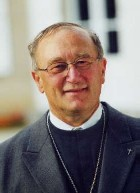
Bishop Armand Maillard

- Pierre-Paul Servonnet (1897–1909)
- Louis-Ernest Dubois (1909–1916), appointed Archbishop of Rouen (Cardinal later that year)
- Martin-Jérôme Izart (1916–1934)
- Louis-Joseph Fillon (1934–1943)
- Joseph-Charles Lefèbvre (1943–1969) (Cardinal in 1960)
- Charles-Marie-Paul Vignancour (1969–1984)
- Pierre Marie Léon Augustin Plateau (1984–2000)
- Hubert Barbier (2000–2007)
- Armand Maillard (2007–2018)
- Jérôme Beau (25 July 2018 – 14 January 2025)
- Sylvain Bataille (16 October 2025 – present)

== See also ==
- Catholic Church in France
- Timeline of Bourges

== Bibliography ==
=== Episcopal lists and notes ===
- Eubel, Conradus, ed. (1913). Hierarchia catholica (in Latin). Vol. Tomus 1 (second ed.). Münster: Libreria Regensbergiana.
- Eubel, Conradus, ed. (1914). Hierarchia catholica (in Latin). Vol. Tomus 2 (second ed.). Münster: Libreria Regensbergiana.
- Eubel, Conradus; Gulik, Guilelmus, eds. (1923). Hierarchia catholica (in Latin). Vol. Tomus 3 (second ed.). Münster: Libreria Regensbergiana.
- Gauchat, Patritius (Patrice) (1935). Hierarchia catholica. Vol. Tomus IV (1592-1667). Münster: Libraria Regensbergiana. (in Latin)
- Ritzler, Remigius; Sefrin, Pirminus (1952). Hierarchia catholica medii et recentis aevi V (1667-1730). Patavii: Messagero di S. Antonio.
- Ritzler, Remigius; Sefrin, Pirminus (1958). Hierarchia catholica medii et recentis aevi. Vol. Tomus VI (1730-1799). Patavii: Messagero di S. Antonio. (in Latin)
- Ritzler, Remigius; Sefrin, Pirminus (1968). Hierarchia Catholica medii et recentioris aevi sive summorum pontificum, S. R. E. cardinalium, ecclesiarum antistitum series... A pontificatu Pii PP. VII (1800) usque ad pontificatum Gregorii PP. XVI (1846) (in Latin). Vol. VII. Monasterii: Libr. Regensburgiana.
- Remigius Ritzler; Pirminus Sefrin (1978). Hierarchia catholica Medii et recentioris aevi... A Pontificatu PII PP. IX (1846) usque ad Pontificatum Leonis PP. XIII (1903) (in Latin). Vol. VIII. Il Messaggero di S. Antonio.
- Pięta, Zenon (2002). Hierarchia catholica medii et recentioris aevi... A pontificatu Pii PP. X (1903) usque ad pontificatum Benedictii PP. XV (1922) (in Latin). Vol. IX. Padua: Messagero di San Antonio. ISBN 978-88-250-1000-8.

=== Studies ===
- De Lacger, Louis (1937). "La primatie d'Aquitaine du VIIIe au XIVe siècle," (in French), in: Revue d'histoire de l'Église de France, Vol. 23, n°98, 1937. pp. 29–50.
- Duchesne, Louis (1900). Fastes épiscopaux de l'ancienne Gaule. (in French). Volume 2. Paris: Fontemoing 1900. [pp. 21–31]. 2nd edition (1910).
- Du Tems, Hugues (1774). Le clergé de France, ou tableau historique et chronologique des archevêques, évêques, abbés, abbesses et chefs des chapitres principaux du royaume, depuis la fondation des églises jusqu'à nos jours (in French). Vol. Tome premier. Paris: Delalain. Tome troisième (1775).
- Giradot, A. de Baron. Histoire du Chapitre de Saint-Etienne de Bourges. Orléans: Alex. Jacob, 1853.
- Jean, Armand (1891). Les évêques et les archevêques de France depuis 1682 jusqu'à 1801 (in French). Paris: A. Picard. Archived.
- Jongleux, Edmond (1895). Bourges et la Révolution française 1789-1804. (in French). Bourges: Léon Renaud 1895.
- Labbé, Philippus (1657). Nova Bibliotheca Manuscript[orum] Librorum Tomus Secundus Rerum Aquitanicarum, Praesertim Bituricensium, uberrima collectio. (in Latin). Paris: Sebastian Cremoisy 1657.
- Marguerye, R. de (1890). "Le grand incendie de la cathédrale de Bourges. Moeurs administratives au XVIe siècle," in: Mémoires de la Société des antiquaires du Centre (Bourges: Tardy-Pigelet 1890), pp. 178–228.
- Pisani, Paul (1907). Répertoire biographique de l'épiscopat constitutionnel (1791-1802) (in French). Paris: A. Picard et fils. pp. 85–96.
- Sainte-Marthe, Denis (1720). Gallia Christiana in provincias ecclesiasticas distributa. (in Latin). Volume 2. Paris: Typographia regia 1720. [pp. 4–221; "Instrumenta," pp. 2–72. [reprint: ed. Paul Paolin 1873]
- Société bibliographique (France) (1907). L'épiscopat français depuis le Concordat jusqu'à la Séparation (1802-1905). Paris: Librairie des Saints-Pères.
