= Olivier de Germay =

French prelate of the Catholic Church (born 1960)

His Excellency The Most Reverend Olivier de Germay
- Archbishop of Lyon; Primate of the Gauls
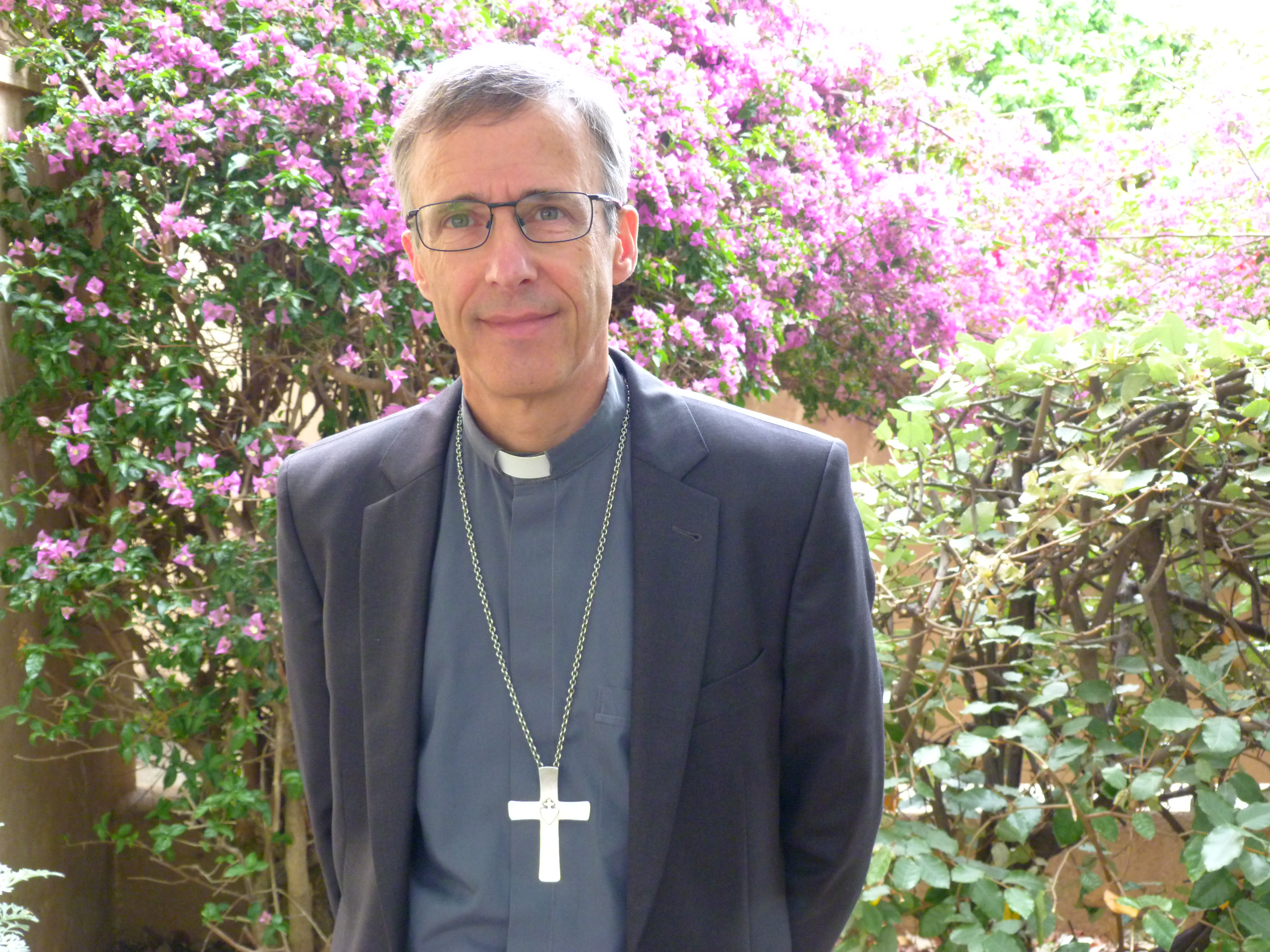
- de Germay in 2017
- Church: Catholic Church
- Archdiocese: Lyon
- Province: Lyon
- Appointed: 22 October 2020
- Installed: 20 December 2020
- Predecessor: Philippe Barbarin
- Previous post: Bishop of Ajaccio (2012–2020)

Orders
- Ordination: 17 May 1998 by Émile Marcus
- Consecration: 14 April 2012 by Georges Pontier

Personal details
- Born: Olivier Jacques Marie Certain de Germay de Cirfontaine; 18 September 1960 (age 66) Tours, France
- Denomination: Roman Catholic
- Education: École spéciale militaire de Saint-Cyr; Catholic University of Toulouse; Pontifical Lateran University
- Motto: Latin: Christus dilexit Ecclesiam, lit. 'Christ loved the Church'
- Coat of arms

Olivier Jacques Marie Certain de Germay de Cirfontaine (born 18 September 1960) is a French prelate of the Catholic Church who has been metropolitan archbishop of Lyon since December 2020. He served as bishop of Ajaccio from 2012 to 2020. Before taking up his clerical career, he served as a paratrooper in the French Army.

== Early life and career ==
Olivier de Germay was born on 18 September 1960 in Tours, France. He was the third of five children born to Christian de Germay, a divisional general in the French Army, and Claude Bullier. After completing his classes préparatoires at the Prytanée nationale militaire in La Flèche, he studied at the Special Military School of Saint-Cyr in Coëtquidan, earning an engineering diploma and the rank of sous-lieutenant. Beginning in 1986 he served five years as an army paratrooper based in Tarbes, taking part in missions in Chad, Central Africa and Iraq. He left the army with the rank of capitaine. He later described a moment of insight he experienced while on duty in Africa:

I lived a few days in the desert. I met people there who lived on three times nothing and who were happier than me. People who exuded an inner peace, while I was grappling with diffuse feelings of unease. I suddenly realized that by leading a life centered on myself, I was moving away from the essential. At that time, I didn't think of becoming a priest, I only had the irrepressible desire to change my life...

== Priesthood ==
He entered the seminary in 1991 and studied at the seminary in Paray-le-Monial for the first cycle, completing his second cycle at the Seminary and University of Pius XI and the Catholic University of Toulouse. Whilst living at the Pontifical French Seminary in Rome, he obtained a licentiate in moral theology from the John Paul II Institute of the Pontifical Lateran University. He was ordained a priest of the Archdiocese of Toulouse on 17 May 1998. He worked as vicar of Castanet-Tolosan and diocesan chaplain of the Guides of France from 1999 to 2001; pastor of the parish ensemble of Catenet from 2001 to 2003; dean of the Banlieues-Sud area of Toulouse from 2003 to 2006; pastor of the parish ensemble of Beauzelle from 2006 to 2012; episcopal vicar for the suburb of Toulouse from 2004 to 2012; professor of sacramental and family theology at the Institut Catholique of Toulouse from 2008 to 2012; and assistant of the Diocesan Service of Family Pastoral Care from 2010 to 2012.

== Episcopacy ==
=== Bishop of Ajaccio ===
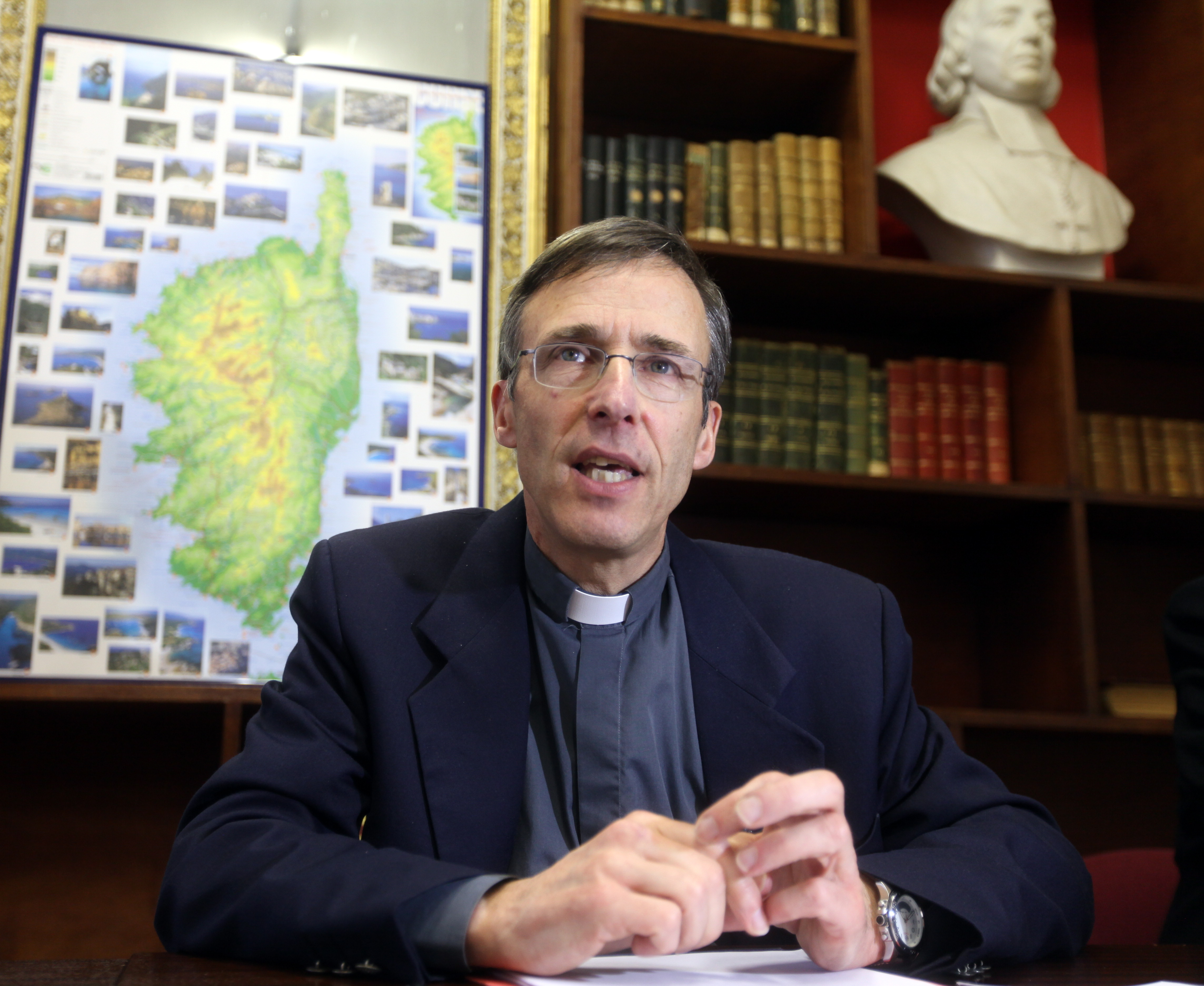
Olivier de Germay, 2013

Ordination history of Olivier de Germay
History
Diaconal ordination
- Ordained by: Émile Marcus
Priestly ordination
- Ordained by: Émile Marcus
Episcopal consecration
- Principal consecrator: Georges Pontier
- Co-consecrators: Robert Le Gall, Jean Bonfils

Styles of Olivier de Germay
- Reference style: The Most Reverend
- Spoken style: Your Excellency
- Religious style: Archbishop

On 22 February 2012, Pope Benedict XVI appointed him Bishop of Ajaccio, despite de Germay never having visited Corsica. He received his episcopal consecration on the following 14 April. He was the second bishop to have been consecrated in Corsica in more than 200 years. As bishop, he chose to draw a priest's stipend. After an attack on an Islamic reading room in his diocese, where anti-Muslim sentiment is strong, he said:

We cannot claim Christian identity if we do not seek peace, fraternity, openness to others. We cannot be satisfied with preserving the outward signs of Christendom. If we do this without worrying about the heart of the faith, we risk finding ourselves in front of an empty shell which will one day crumble. Because, alongside the defense of these external signs, Corsica is experiencing a real crisis of transmission of the faith.

The Bishops' Conference of France elected him as an alternate delegate to the 2015 Synod on the Family. On the Synod's consideration of access to the sacraments for those who are divorced and attempted remarriage, he underlined its insistence on accompaniment and individual histories, adding that "it was already being done but perhaps not enough: one can be divorced-remarried and have responsibilities in the Church."

During the COVID-19 pandemic in 2020, he supported the government's restrictions on gatherings, but protested when its relaxation of its confinement policy ignored the recommendations of the French bishops in anticipation of the public celebrations of Pentecost. He warned the government not to "muzzle" the Church.

=== Metropolitan archbishop of Lyon ===
Pope Francis named him metropolitan archbishop of Lyon on 22 October 2020. He was installed there on 20 December 2020. He had not been mentioned in press speculation as a candidate for Lyon and Le Monde called it "a surprise".

As archbishop of Lyon, de Germay holds the title of Primate of the Gauls.

Given the cases of sexual abuse and his predecessor's trial and acquittal, de Germay said he was "arriving on tiptoe" in Lyon. Within the Bishops' Conference of France, he is a member of the Council for Movements and Associations of Faithful.

== Views ==
De Germay is considered a conservative, and is outspoken on issues pertaining to marriage and sexuality. In an interview with Corse-Matin, when asked about the Church's opposition to condoms, he said that "[s]he has something more profound to tell young people about the beauty of sexuality than essentially hygienic discourse." Commenting on clerical celibacy, he remarked that his relationship to God as a cleric can be on the "same order as a loving relationship [marriage]" and offered an indirect defence of the Latin Church's practice of mandatory celibacy by mentioning the struggles married Eastern Church clergy had confided to him.
