= Homec, Domžale =

Homec
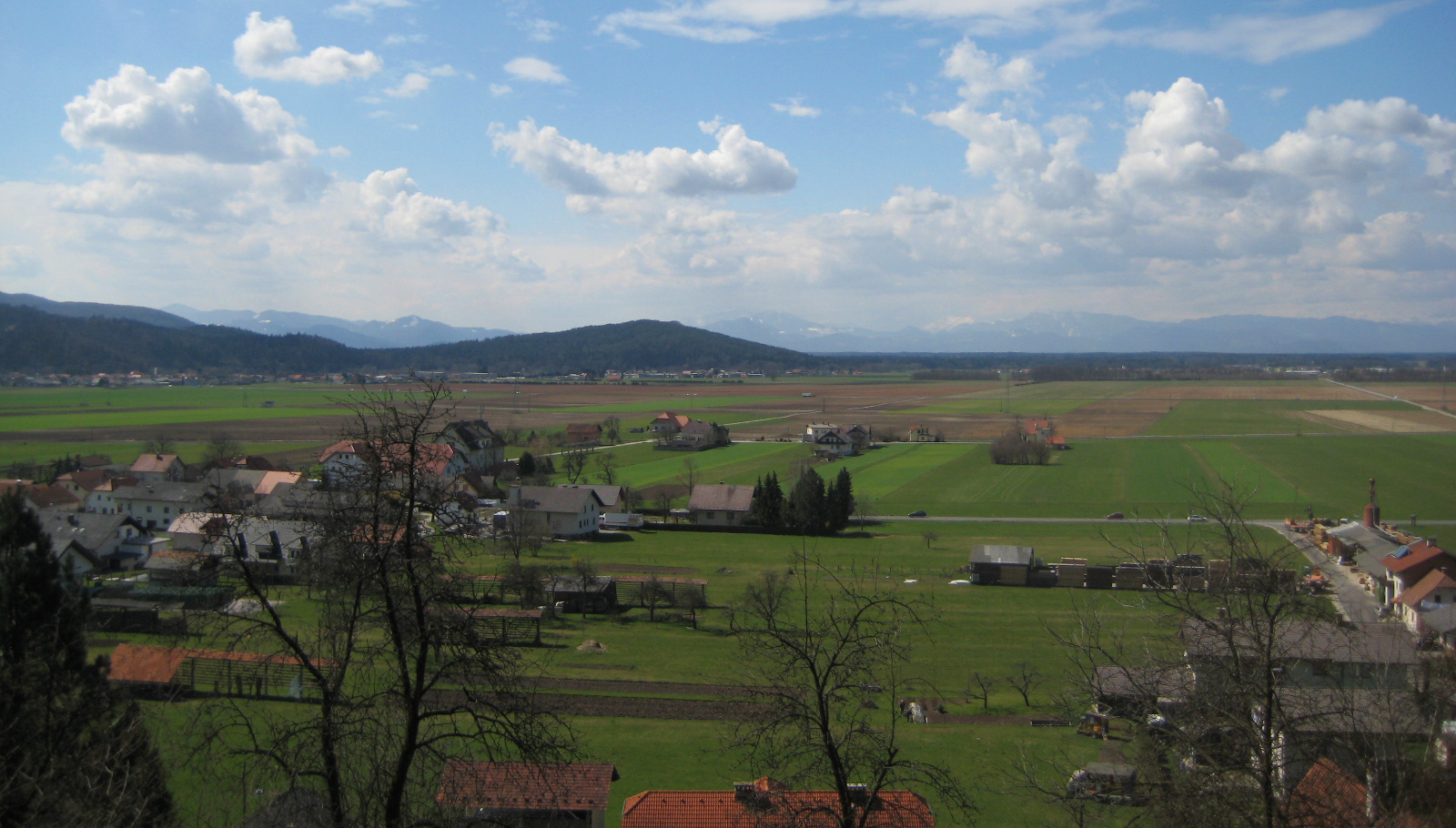

- Location in Slovenia
- Coordinates: 46°10′36.22″N 14°35′52.69″E
- Country: Slovenia
- Traditional region: Upper Carniola
- Statistical region: Central Slovenia
- Municipality: Domžale

Area
  - Total: 1.71 km^{2} (0.66 sq mi)
- Elevation: 332.5 m (1,091 ft)

Population (2020)
  - Total: 888
  - Density: 519/km^{2} (1,340/sq mi)

Homec (pronounced [ˈxɔːməts]; German: Homez) is a settlement north of Domžale in the Upper Carniola region of Slovenia.

The parish church in the settlement is dedicated to the Nativity of Mary.
