= Maurice de Germiny =

French Roman Catholic bishop (1939–2026)

His Excellency Maurice de Germiny
- Bishop Emeritus of Blois
- Archdiocese: Tours
- Diocese: Blois
- Appointed: 27 March 1997
- Term ended: 22 November 2014
- Predecessor: Jean Cuminal
- Successor: Jean-Pierre Louis Roger Sylvain Batut

Orders
- Ordination: 29 June 1974 by François Marty
- Consecration: 24 May 1997 by Jean-Marie Lustiger, Pierre Plateau and Henri Brincard

Personal details
- Born: 23 November 1939 Saint-Maurice-du-Désert, France
- Died: 23 September 2026 (aged 86) La Ferté-Macé, France
- Education: École Nationale des Chartes
- Coat of arms

Styles of Maurice de Germiny
- Reference style: The Most Reverend
- Spoken style: Your Excellency
- Religious style: Monsignor
- Posthumous style: none

Maurice Le Bègue de Germiny (23 November 1939 – 23 September 2026) was a French Roman Catholic prelate who was the bishop of Blois from 1997 to 2014. He hailed from a French aristocratic family. One of his ancestors was a French ambassador to the Sublime Porte in the 16th century.

De Germiny qualified as an archivist at the Ecole des Chartes in Paris, and became responsible for the departmental archives of the Jura. He subsequently trained for the ministry and became curate of Saint-Séverin, a Left Bank parish of Paris. He was later named vicar general of Paris.

De Germiny died on 23 September 2026, at the age of 86.
