= Felix of Bourges =

Bishop of Bourges (died c. 580)

Felix of Bourges (died c. 580) was a bishop of Bourges who later became recognized as a saint.

Relatively few details of Felix's life are known. He is known to have been consecrated bishop by Germain of Paris around 560. A man of great wisdom, he is known to have taken part in the fourth Council of Paris in 573. Venantius Fortunatus addressed a poem to Felix regarding a golden pyx which Felix commissioned.

Felix was originally buried in the church of Austregisilus de Castro, outside the city's walls. Popular veneration of him developed quickly. Gregory of Tours relates that twelve years after Felix's death, the stone slab which covered his remains was replaced by a slab of more precious material. Several miracles were reported as having occurred to those who drank water containing some of the stone dust from the original slab.

Felix had a strong devotion to the Holy Eucharist, and many miracles are attributed to his intercession. He is invoked against fevers.

== Sources ==
- Burns, Paul. Butler's Lives of the Saints:New Full Edition. Collegeville, MN:The Liturgical Press, 1995. ISBN 0-8146-2377-8.
