= Paul-Louis Carrière =

- Bishop of Diocese of Laval Emeritus
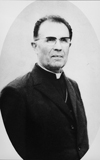
- Church: Roman Catholic Church
- See: Diocese of Laval
- In office: 1969–1984
- Predecessor: Charles-Marie-Jacques Guilhem
- Successor: Louis-Marie Billé

Orders
- Ordination: 8 July 1931

Personal details
- Born: 30 March 1908; Châlons-en-Champagne
- Died: 21 February 2008 (aged 99)

Paul-Louis Carrière (30 March 1908 – 21 February 2008) was a French prelate of the Catholic Church.

Carrière was born in Châlons-en-Champagne and was ordained a priest on 8 July 1931. He was appointed coadjutor bishop of the Diocese of Laval and titular bishop of Ladicum on 5 November 1968, and was consecrated on 11 January 1969. He succeeded as bishop of the Diocese of Laval when bishop Charles-Marie-Jacques Guilhem resigned on 31 December 1969, where he remained until retiring on 10 March 1984.

Carrière died on 21 February 2008, a month shy of his 100th birthday in Châlons-en-Champagne.

== See also ==
- Diocese of Laval
