= Philippe Barbarin =

French Catholic cardinal (born 1950)

His Eminence Philippe Barbarin
- Archbishop Emeritus of Lyon; Cardinal-Priest of SS. Trinità al Monte Pincio
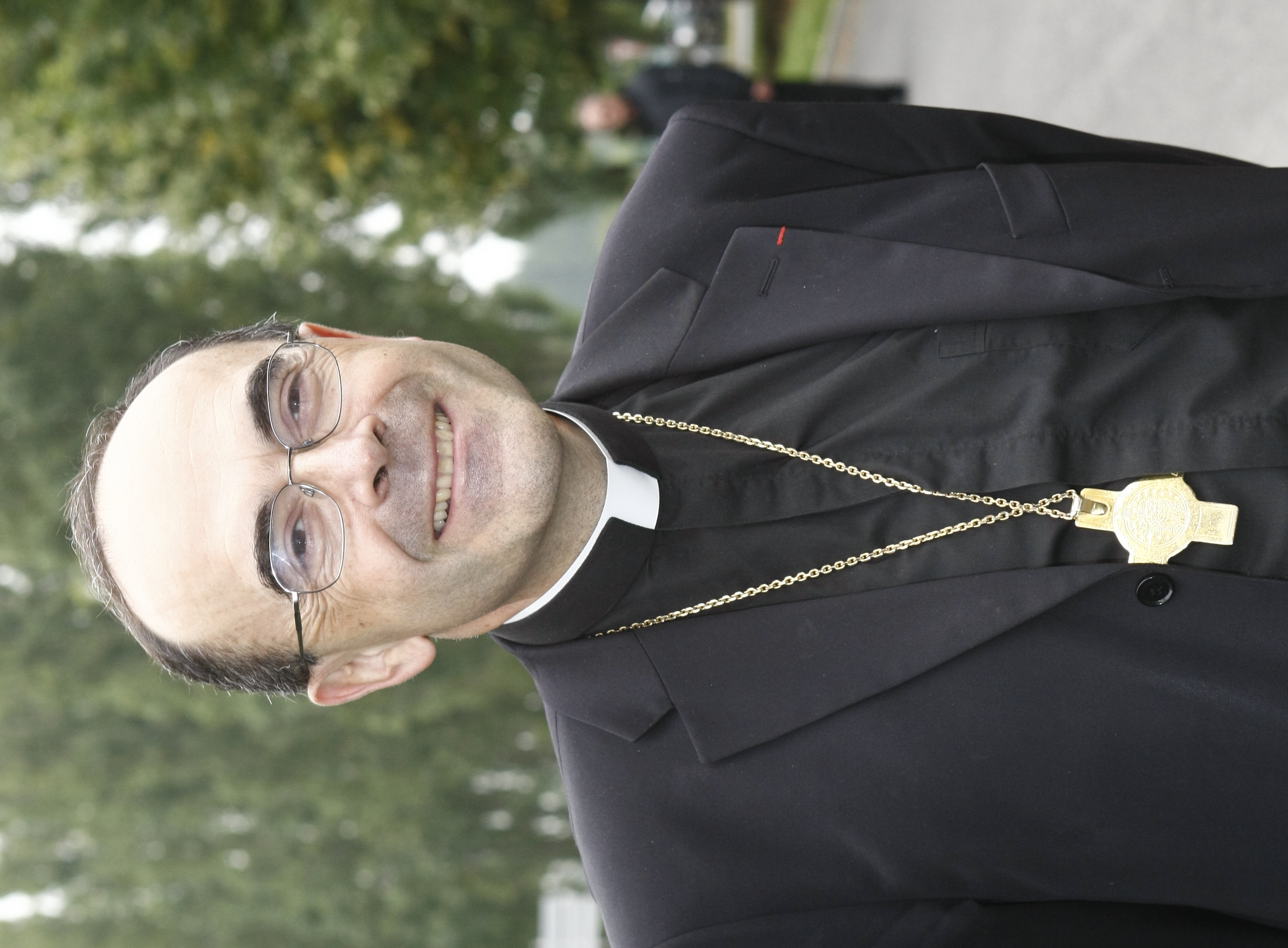
- Barbarin in 2008
- Church: Catholic Church
- See: Lyon
- Appointed: 16 July 2002
- Installed: 14 September 2002
- Term ended: 6 March 2020
- Predecessor: Louis-Marie Billé
- Successor: Olivier de Germay
- Previous post: Bishop of Moulins (1998–2002)

Orders
- Ordination: 17 December 1977 by Robert Marie-Joseph François de Provenchères
- Consecration: 22 November 1998 by Philibert Randriambololona
- Created cardinal: 21 October 2003 by Pope John Paul II
- Rank: Cardinal-Priest

Personal details
- Born: Philippe Xavier Ignace Barbarin; 17 October 1950 (age 75) Rabat, French Morocco
- Denomination: Roman Catholic
- Motto: Qu'ils soient un
- Coat of arms

Styles of Philippe Barbarin
- Reference style: His Eminence
- Spoken style: Your Eminence
- Informal style: Cardinal
- See: Lyon

Philippe Xavier Christian Ignace Marie Barbarin (French pronunciation: [filip baʁbaʁɛ̃]; born 17 October 1950) is a French Catholic prelate who served as Archbishop of Lyon from 2002 to 2020. He was made a cardinal in 2003. He was convicted in 2019 of failing to report alleged sex abuse by a priest and was given a suspended six-month prison sentence. The same year, Barbarin turned the archdiocese over to an administrator while he appealed his case. His conviction was overturned in 2020 but Pope Francis accepted his resignation just over a month later.

== Biography ==
=== Early life and career ===
Philippe Barbarin was born in 1950 in Rabat, French Morocco, then a French protectorate, into a large family with six sisters, two of whom are nuns, and four brothers. Barbarin studied at the public Lycée Marcellin Berthelot in Saint-Maur and then in Paris at the Catholic Collège des Francs-Bourgeois, where he completed his baccalaureate. He studied philosophy at the Major Seminary of Paris, the Institute for Comparative Philosophy, and the Sorbonne, interrupted for a time by military service. In 1973 he entered the Institut Catholique de Paris, where he earned a theology bachelor. He was ordained on 17 December 1977 by Bishop Robert de Provenchères of Créteil.

Barbarin held a variety of pastoral assignments in France until 1994, when he taught theology in the Archdiocese of Fianarantsoa, Madagascar.

=== Episcopal career ===
On 1 October 1998, he was appointed Bishop of Moulins. He received his episcopal consecration on the following 22 November from the Jesuit Archbishop Philibert Randriambololona of Fianarantsoa, with Bishops André Quélen and Daniel Labille serving as co-consecrators.

Barbarin was named Archbishop of Lyon on 16 July 2002.

In 2010, Barbarin created a programme at the diocesan seminary to prepare for the priesthood any Francophone candidate who wished, in accordance with the tradition in which he was raised, to celebrate Mass according to the 1962 Roman Missal.

In November 2012, as France prepared to legalize same-sex marriage, he told Osservatore Romano: "Everyone knows marriage is the union between a man and a woman. The parliaments of the 21st century cannot change that.... I and many other priests are engaged in dialogue with a number of homosexual people. They know they are loved and that they will always be welcome. I would remind them however that God watches over and says to everyone: 'You are precious in my eyes.' I hope that everyone listens to Christ's call and are helped to reciprocate."

In July 2015, he led the bishops of the Rhône-Alpes region in calling for a Reims hospital to maintain the life support systems of Vincent Lambert, a man who had been in a coma for seven years.

He has been "at the forefront of Islamic-Christian dialogue". In 2013, accompanied by the Imam of Lyon, he visited the village of Tibhirine, Algeria, where some Trappist monks were assassinated in 1996. In July 2014, he visited Mosul and Erbil and other villages in Iraq as well as refugee camps for displaced Christians.

In addition to his native French, Barbarin speaks Italian, English, Spanish, German, and Malagasy.

=== Cardinal ===
Pope John Paul II made him cardinal-priest of SS. Trinità al Monte Pincio in the consistory of 21 October 2003. On 24 November 2003, he was made a member of the Congregation for Divine Worship and the Discipline of the Sacraments and the Congregation for Institutes of Consecrated Life and Societies of Apostolic Life.

Barbarin was one of the cardinal electors who participated in the 2005 papal conclave that elected Pope Benedict XVI, and in the 2013 papal conclave that elected Pope Francis. Barbarin was also one of the cardinal electors who participated in the 2025 papal conclave which elected Pope Leo XIV.

=== Health ===
Barbarin suffered a double heart attack on a flight from Lyon to 2013 World Youth Day in Rio de Janeiro. He was taken to a hospital in Cayenne, French Guiana, where he received a coronary angiography. He was transferred to Fort de France, Martinique, where he underwent a triple bypass operation on 23 July 2013.

=== Handling sexual abuse ===
Barbarin, and several now deceased archbishops of Lyon before him, did not report to civil authorities the sexual abuse committed by priest Bernard Preynat during Boy Scout outings between 1986 and 1991. Failure to report such crimes to police is by itself a crime under French law. Barbarin, four of his subordinates, and Gerhard Ludwig Cardinal Müller, Prefect of the Congregation for the Doctrine of the Faith in the Vatican, were defendants in a lawsuit by the former boy scouts abused by Preynat. A judge conducted a preliminary inquiry. On 1 August 2016, the prosecuting attorney dropped the case largely based on concerns about the statute of limitations. However, Barbarin and six other priests were charged in 2017 for their failure to report the incidents to the civil authorities. The trial was scheduled to begin on 4 April 2018, but was postponed.

Prosecutor Charlotte Trabut announced that she would not file charges because the statute of limitations had passed for some charges and there was insufficient evidence to support conviction. The victims invoked their right to press charges, and Barbarin's trial began on 7 January 2019. Five priests accused of assisting Barbarin in the cover-up were co-defendants. The trial ended on 10 January, and, on 7 March, Barbarin was found guilty and given a suspended prison sentence of six months. His co-defendants were acquitted. Barbarin's attorney said his client would appeal the verdict. Barbarin said he intended to meet with Pope Francis and resign as Archbishop of Lyon. Barbarin was reported to have planned to resign "for the good of the Archdiocese" no matter what the verdict.

=== Post-trial status ===
Barbarin submitted his resignation to Pope Francis in person on 18 March 2019. Francis, "invoking the presumption of innocence", refused the resignation and asked Barbarin to take whatever action he thought appropriate. Barbarin announced on 19 March that Yves Baumgarten, vicar general of the Archdiocese, would replace him temporarily. (Note: On 5 July 2019, it was announced that the Vatican defrocked Preynat after convicting him of sex abuse. During his second criminal trial in January 2019, which involves 35 cases of sex abuse, Preynat confessed that he had a habit of "caressing" boy scouts he oversaw when he served as scout chaplain in a Lyon suburb and that he did so in a way that brought him "sexual pleasure.")

On 24 June 2019, Pope Francis named Michel Dubost, Bishop emeritus of Evry-Corbeil-Essonnes, to serve as apostolic administrator sede plena of the Archdiocese, which meant Dubost had authority over the affairs of the archdiocese while Barbarin retained his archbishop's title. Barbarin's conviction was overturned on appeal on 30 January 2020. The appeals court accepted Barbarin's arguments that the law did not require him to report the allegations to authorities because he learned of their allegations when Preynat's victims were adults and that he had not discouraged them making their allegations directly to the police. Barbarin said he planned to meet with Pope Francis to submit his resignation again.

Pope Francis accepted his resignation on 6 March 2020. Bernard Preynat was convicted of sexually assaulting boy scouts and given a five-year prison sentence on 16 March 2020. The Court of Cassation—the highest court of France—cleared Barbarin in April 2021.

== In popular culture ==
Barbarin was played by François Marthouret in the French film By the Grace of God, which chronicled a sex abuse scandal involving the Archdiocese of Lyon.

== See also ==
- Catholic Church in France
- List of the Roman Catholic dioceses of France

== Notes ==
Catholic Church titles
Preceded by André Bernard Michel Quélen	Bishop of Moulins; 1 October 1998 – 16 July 2002	Succeeded by Pascal Roland
Preceded by Louis-Marie Billé	Archbishop of Lyon; 16 July 2002 – 6 March 2020	Succeeded by Olivier de Germay
Preceded by Louis-Marie Billé	Cardinal-Priest of SS. Trinità al Monte Pincio; 21 October 2003 – present	Incumbent
