= Ursinus of Bourges =

Gallo-Roman bishop and saint

Saint Ursinus of Bourges
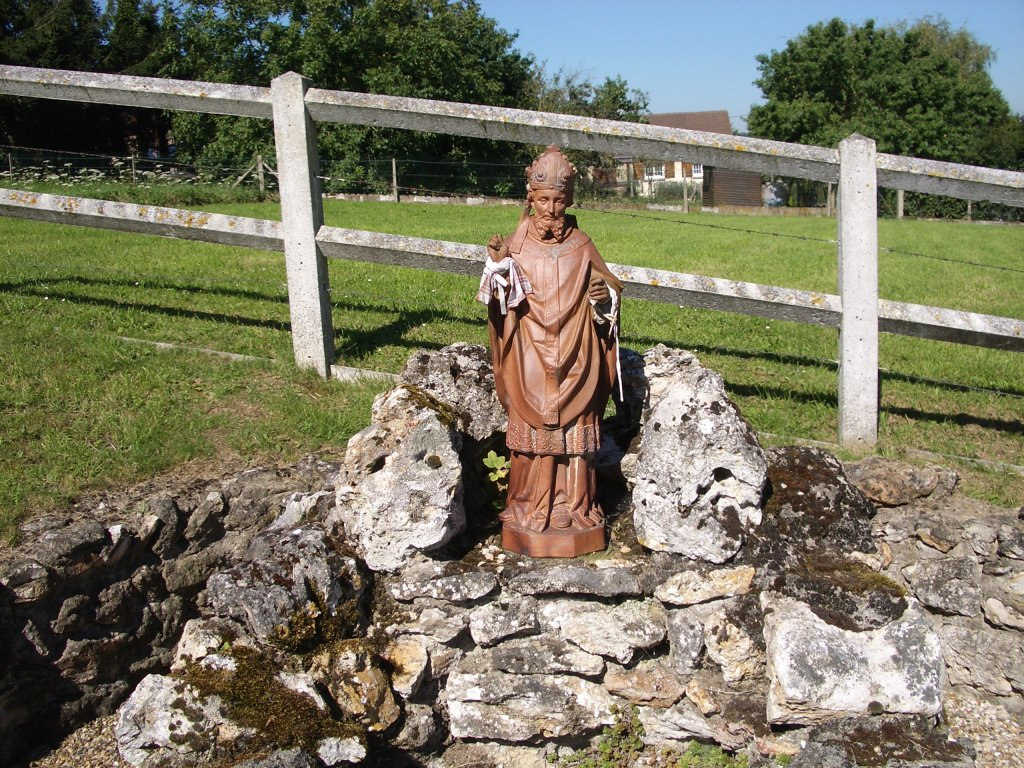
- Statue of Saint Ursinus. Villers-sur-le-Roule (Eure)
- Died: 3rd century
- Venerated in: Roman Catholic Church
- Feast: November 9

Saint Ursinus of Bourges (French: Ursin) (3rd or 4th century) is venerated as a saint by the Catholic Church and is considered the first bishop of Bourges.

Gregory of Tours' legendary account associated him with a Nathaniel, friend of Philip the Apostle, that he was present at the Last Supper, and read a lesson there. It also states that he was present at the martyrdom of Saint Stephen, and that Saint Peter sent him to Gaul as a missionary. Ursinus is not alone among founding bishops in France whose time of flourishing was moved back to the apostolic period, bolstering episcopal claims of primacy: as Hippolyte Delehaye writes, "To have lived amongst the Saviour's immediate following was...honorable...and accordingly old patrons of churches were identified with certain persons in the gospels or who were supposed to have had some part of Christ's life on earth."

== Notes ==
- Hippolyte Delehaye, The Legends of the Saints (Dublin, Four Courts Press, 1955), 37.
