= Pierre Plateau =

French bishop of the Roman Catholic Church

His Excellency Pierre Marie Léon Augustin Plateau
- Archbishop of Bourges
- Church: Roman Catholic Church
- See: Roman Catholic Archdiocese of Bourges
- In office: 1984–2000
- Predecessor: Charles-Marie-Paul Vignancour
- Successor: Hubert Marie Pierre Dominique Barbier
- Previous post: Auxiliary Bishop of Rennes (1979–1984)

Orders
- Ordination: June 28, 1947
- Consecration: April 22, 1979 by Paul Gouyon
- Rank: Bishop

Personal details
- Born: January 10, 1924 Saint-Servan, France
- Died: April 26, 2018 (aged 94) Saint-Malo, Ille-et-Vilaine, France

Pierre Marie Léon Augustin Plateau (January 10, 1924 – April 26, 2018) was a French prelate of the Roman Catholic Church.

Plateau was born in Saint-Servan and ordained a priest on June 28, 1947. Plateau was appointed auxiliary bishop to the Archdiocese of Rennes as well as Titular bishop of Gunela on February 2, 1979, and was consecrated on April 22, 1979. Plateau was appointed to the Archdiocese of Bourges on April 8, 1984, from which he retired on April 25, 2000. As Archbishop he welcomed the Little Sisters Disciples of the Lamb to the archdiocese.
