= Diocese of Blois =

Catholic diocese in France

Coordinates: 47°35′19″N 1°20′09″E

Diocese of Blois Dioecesis Blesensis Diocèse de Blois

Catholic
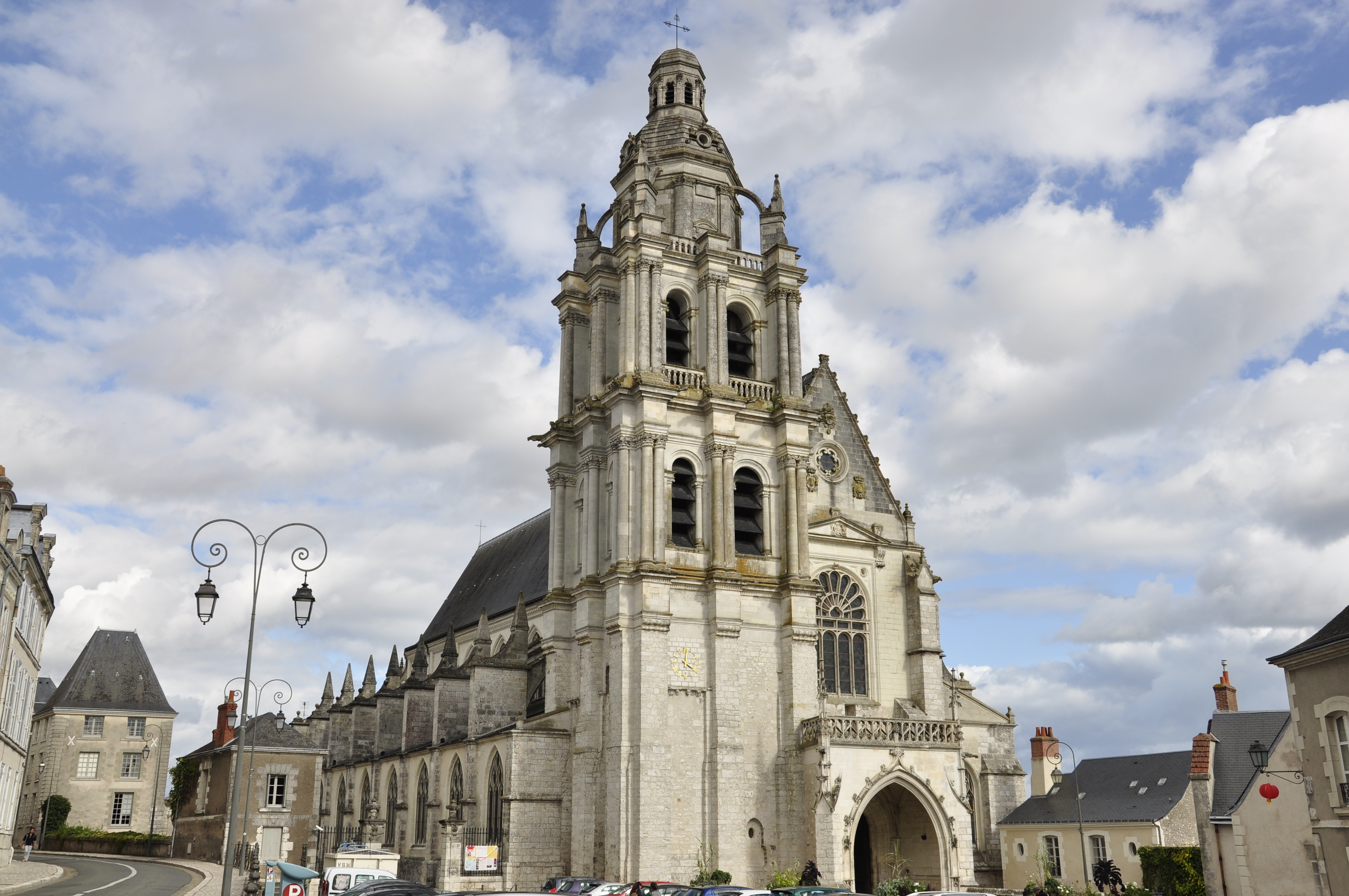
- Blois Cathedral

Location
- Country: France
- Ecclesiastical province: Tours
- Metropolitan: Archdiocese of Tours

Statistics
- Area: 6,422 km^{2} (2,480 sq mi)
- Population: Total; Catholics: (as of 2022); 343,000 (est.); 187,000 (est._
- Parishes: 293

Information
- Denomination: Catholic
- Sui iuris church: Latin Church
- Rite: Roman Rite
- Established: 1 July 1697
- Cathedral: Cathedral of St. Louis in Blois
- Patron saint: St. Louis IX of France
- Secular priests: 50 (Diocesan); 16 (Religious Orders); 16 Permanent Deacons

Current leadership
- Pope: Leo XIV
- Bishop: Francis Bestion
- Metropolitan Archbishop: Vincent Jordy

Map

Website
- Website of the Diocese

The Diocese of Blois (Latin: Dioecesis Blesensis; French: Diocèse de Blois) is a Latin Church diocese of the Catholic Church in France. The diocese lies in western France, and encompasses the department of Loir-et-Cher. Since 2002 it has been a suffragan of the Archdiocese of Tours. The episcopal seat is currently vacant since the appointment of Jean-Pierre Batut to Toulouse as auxiliary bishop on 26 June 2023.

In 2022, in the Diocese of Blois, there was one priest for every 2,833 Catholics.

== History ==
On 1 July 1697 Pope Innocent XII, at the request of King Louis XIV of France, canonically erected the diocese of Blois from territory of the Diocese of Chartres. The Archdeacon of Blois had up to that time been a dignity in the diocese of Chartres. The diocese was created in order to combat the considerable Huguenot influence in the southern part of the Diocese of Chartres. Since the new diocese had need of a cathedral, the parish Church of Saint Solenne was chosen; the church had been severely damaged in a fire in 1678, and it was in the last stages of reconstruction in 1697. It was renamed the Cathedral of Saint Louis.

With a new cathedral, a new Cathedral Chapter was required. The canons of the Collegiate Church of Saint Salvator, whose church had been sacked and destroyed by the Huguenots in the previous century and only gradually rebuilt, were transferred to the new Cathedral of Saint Louis. The dignities were the Dean, the Precentor, the Subdean, the Provost, the Treasurer and the Prior of S. Solenne. Twelve additional Canons were instituted, to be named alternately by the King and the Bishop. In addition thirty-two chaplains were created, one of whom would administer the Church of Saint Salvator. The benefices which had been in the gift of the Collegiate Chapter of S. Salvator continued to be under the control of the Canons, who also named the Canons who were to preside at S. Salvator on certain days. To support the Canons of the Cathedral of Saint Louis, the income of two monasteries and five priories was redirected by papal bull. Even so, since the number of twelve Canons was thought to be too small for a cathedral, the Chapter of the Hospital of S. James (founded in 1346) was also transferred to the Chapter of Saint Louis by the first bishop, David-Nicolas de Berthier, with the consent of all parties. In 1753 there were eighteen Canons. All cathedral chapters were dissolved by order of the Constituent Assembly and the Legislative Assembly by virtue of the Civil Constitution of the Clergy in 1791. On 2 July 1699 Bishop de Berthier created two Archdeacons, who were added to the dignities of the Cathedral Chapter.

At the beginning of the Revolution, the Constituent Assembly decided that the number of dioceses in France was excessive, and that approximately fifty of them could be eliminated. Those which survived would have their boundaries changed to coincide with new political subdivisions of France, called 'départements'. This was contrary to Canon Law. Blois belonged to the Department of Loire-et-Cher in the Constitutional Church erected by the National Constituent Assembly and its successor the Legislative Assembly. On 18 February the electors of the department elected Henri Gregoire as Bishop of Loire-et-Cher, who liked to call himself Bishop of Blois, even though the legitimate Bishop of Blois, Alexandre-François de Mazières de Thémines was alive and in exile. Religion was abolished during the Reign of Terror, and the Constitutional Church along with it. When religion was restored in 1795, Gregoire made considerable efforts to revive what was left of the Constitutional Church; he held a diocesan synod in September 1800.

The Concordat of 1801 gave Loir-et-Cher to the Diocese of Orléans, and the Diocese of Blois was canonically suppressed by Pope Pius VII. When Pius called for the resignations of all the bishops of France, Constitutional and non-juring both, Bishop de Thémines refused, and entered into schism himself. On 27 July 1817 the Diocese of Blois was canonically re-established by Pius VII, though difficulties between the Vatican and French National Assembly retarded the full implementation of the new Concordat. Before the French Revolution, the Diocese of Blois was less extensive than at present, almost the entire arrondissement of Romorantin having been subject to the Bishopric of Orléans, and the Bas-Vendômois to the Bishop of Le Mans previous to 1817.

Bishop Alexandre de Lauzières-Thémines, who was bishop of Blois from 1776 until he went into exile in 1790, dying in Bruxelles in 1829, was one of the most obstinate enemies of the Concordat. Pope Pius VII appointed a new bishop of Blois in 1823.

== Bishops ==
- David-Nicolas de Berthier (1 July 1697 – 20 August 1719)
- Jean Paul François Le Févre de Caumartin (4 March 1720 – 30 August 1733)
- Charles-Henri Phélypeaux (1734) (nominated, never instituted)
- François de Crussol d'Uzès (17 November 1734 – 26 September 1753)
- Charles-Gilbert de May de Termont (10 December 1753 – 22 July 1776)
- Alexandre de Lauzières-Thémines (1776 – illegally deposed in 1790)
  - Henri Grégoire (1790 – 1793) (constitutional bishop)
- Philippe-François Sausin (16 May 1823 – 5 March 1844)
- Marie-Auguste Fabre-des-Essarts (17 June 1844 – 20 October 1850)
- Louis-Théophile Pallu du Parc (17 February 1851 – 31 March 1877)
- Charles-Honoré Laborde (25 June 1877 – 18 May 1907)
- Alfred-Jules Mélisson (10 October 1907 – 9 February 1925)
- Georges-Marie-Eugène Audollent (15 May 1925 – 9 November 1944)
- Louis-Sylvain Robin (1945 – 1961)
- Joseph-Marie-Georges-Michel Goupy (1961 – 1990)
- Jean Cuminal (1990 – 1996)
- Maurice de Germiny (1997 – 2014))
- Jean-Pierre Batut (22 November 2014 – 26 June 2023)

== See also ==
- Catholic Church in France

== Bibliography ==
=== Reference works ===
- Gams, Pius Bonifatius (1873). Series episcoporum Ecclesiae catholicae: quotquot innotuerunt a beato Petro apostolo. Ratisbon: Typis et Sumptibus Georgii Josephi Manz. pp. 518–519. (Use with caution; obsolete)
- Ritzler, Remigius; Sefrin, Pirminus (1952). Hierarchia catholica medii et recentis aevi V (1667-1730). Patavii: Messagero di S. Antonio.
- Ritzler, Remigius; Sefrin, Pirminus (1958). Hierarchia catholica medii et recentis aevi VI (1730-1799). Patavii: Messagero di S. Antonio.
- Ritzler, Remigius; Sefrin, Pirminus (1968). Hierarchia Catholica medii et recentioris aevi sive summorum pontificum, S. R. E. cardinalium, ecclesiarum antistitum series... A pontificatu Pii PP. VII (1800) usque ad pontificatum Gregorii PP. XVI (1846) (in Latin). Vol. VII. Monasterii: Libr. Regensburgiana.
- Remigius Ritzler; Pirminus Sefrin (1978). Hierarchia catholica Medii et recentioris aevi... A Pontificatu PII PP. IX (1846) usque ad Pontificatum Leonis PP. XIII (1903) (in Latin). Vol. VIII. Il Messaggero di S. Antonio.
- Pięta, Zenon (2002). Hierarchia catholica medii et recentioris aevi... A pontificatu Pii PP. X (1903) usque ad pontificatum Benedictii PP. XV (1922) (in Latin). Vol. IX. Padua: Messagero di San Antonio. ISBN 978-88-250-1000-8.

=== Studies ===
- Benedictines of S. Maur, ed. (1744). Gallia Christiana, In Provincias Ecclesiasticas Distributa (in Latin). Vol. Tomus octavus (8). Paris: Ex Typographia Regia. pp. 1343–1407, Instrumenta pp. 412–478.
- Gallerand, J. (1929). Les Cultes sous la Terreur en Loir-et-Cher Blois: Grande Imprimerie.
- Jean, Armand (1891). Les évêques et les archevêques de France depuis 1682 jusqu'à 1801 (in French). Paris: A. Picard. p. 78.
- Société bibliographique (France) (1907). L'épiscopat français depuis le Concordat jusqu'à la Séparation (1802-1905). Paris: Librairie des Saints-Pères.

=== External links ===
- (in French) Centre national des Archives de l'Église de France, L’Épiscopat francais depuis 1919, retrieved: 2016-12-24.
- Goyau, Georges. "Blois." The Catholic Encyclopedia. Vol. 2. New York: Robert Appleton Company, 1907. Retrieved: 11 May 2017
