= Angelbert (bishop of Reims) =

Angelbert (Anglebert or Engelbert Latin: Anglebertus) was the 23rd Bishop of Reims between 642 and 645 and successor to Leudigisil.

He is known from Flodoard, but not much detail is known about him. One source suggests he was known to have disputed with Gallus II, who later became the Bishop of Clermont.

Angelbert died in 645 and was then succeeded by Lando.

Catholic Church titles
Preceded by Leudigisil	Bishop of Rheims ca. 642–645	Succeeded by Lando
