= Betause =

4th-century Bishop of Reims (d. 327)

Betause (died 327) was a 4th-century Bishop of Reims.

Of Greek origin, he was the nephew of Pope Eusebius, the son of his sister. He was ordained fourth bishop of Rheims by Pope Miltiades in 312AD and attended the Council of Arles of 314 with his deacon, Primogenite. He is listed in the council records as from "the first province of Belgium".

By 314AD, Betause had built a new cathedral because until then, the Christians in Reims had only a small building and a cemetery outside the city. The new church was dedicated to the Holy Apostles.

He asked Pope Sylvester I to transfer the seat of the bishopric to Reims which was moved under Saint Nicaise. This church was destroyed at the end of the 18th century.

He also built the Saint-Christophe chapel where saint Rémi was later buried. Betause died in 327.
