= Lando (bishop of Reims) =

Lando (French: Landon) was the 24th Bishop of Reims from 645 until 649 during the Merovingian dynasty. He was a wealthy nobleman and the brother of Erchinoald who served as a Mayor of the Palace in Neustria under Clovis II.

There are few details written about him in most sources, possibly due to his short tenure as bishop. He was noted as a contemporary of Sigebert III and is generally described positively in most of the ecclesiastical literature. He is generally agreed to have increased the wealth of the church in Reim by granting the church numerous lands and leaving his wealth to the Church upon his death.

Lando was buried in the Basilica of Saint-Remi upon his death on March 13, 649.

Catholic Church titles
Preceded by Engelbert	Bishop of Rheims ca. 645–649	Succeeded by Nivard
