= Saint Remigius Church =

- Sint-Remigiuskerk
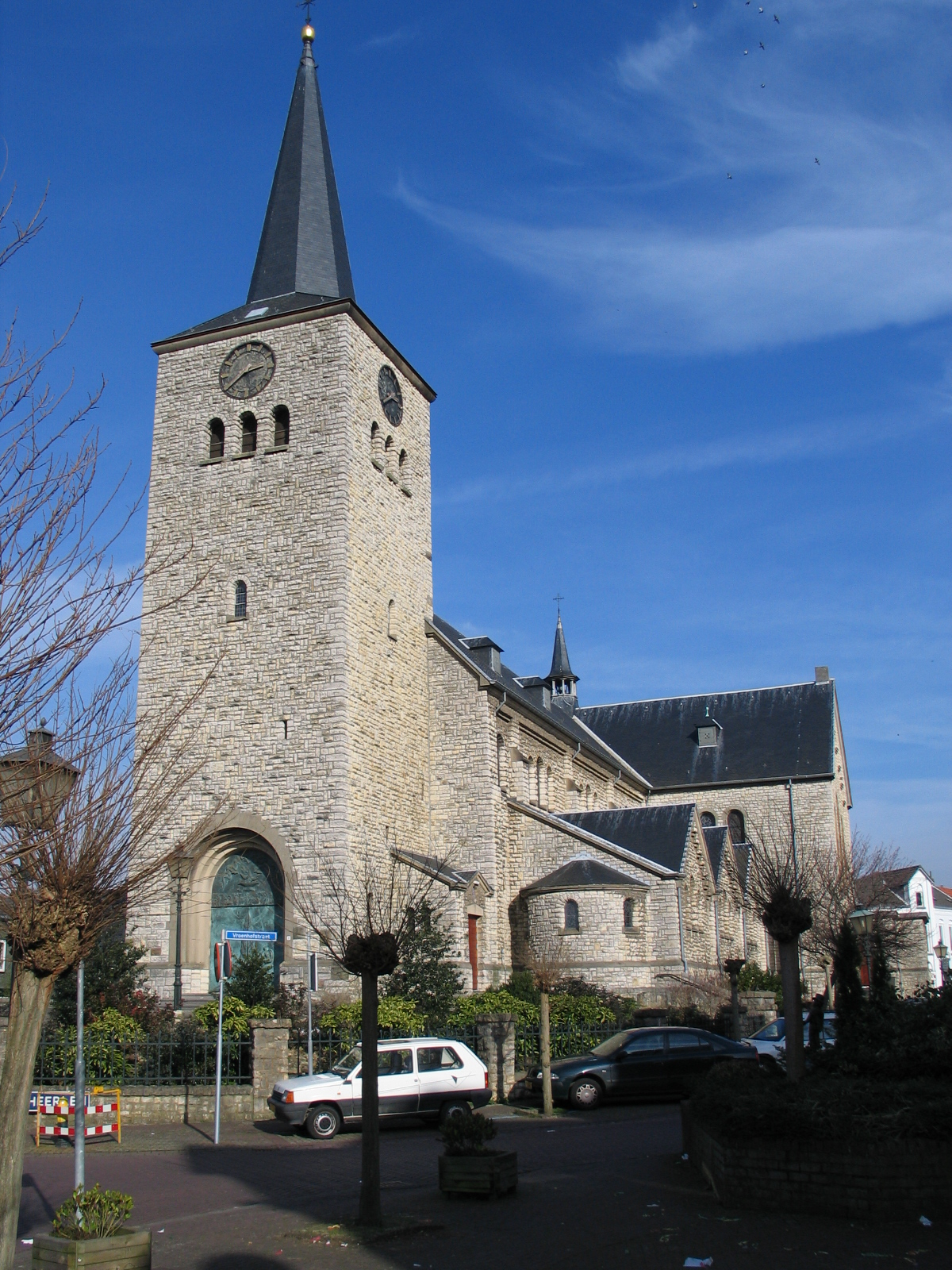
- Saint Remigius Church
- 50.8341°N 5.9820°E
- Location: Simpelveld
- Country: Netherlands
- Denomination: Roman Catholic
- Website: parochiesimpelveld.nl

History
- Status: Rijksmonument
- Founded: 1921-1925

Architecture
- Functional status: Catholic church
- Architect: Caspar Franssen
- Style: Neoroman

The Saint Remigius Church (Dutch: Sint-Remigiuskerk) is a Roman Catholic church building in Simpelveld, The Netherlands. It is a neoroman cross shaped church with three naves, a tower with a waisted top, and a round apse. It is completely made up out of Kunradersteen, a local variant of chalk. The building is used as parish church for the local Saint Remigius parish. Patron saint for the church is Saint Remigius. Due to the inventory of the church, it has been listed as a rijksmonument, making it a national heritage site of the Netherlands.

== History ==
The first mention of a church in Simpelveld dates from 1147. In this period Simpelveld was part of the diocese of Liège. First mention of the church being linked to Saint Remigius dates from 1203. The first church was largely destroyed during the Dutch Revolt and was later restored.

During the 19th and 20th century the population of Simpelveld increased, and the church was considered to be too small. Between 1921 and 1925 the church was extended by order of the parish priest, Hendrik Brewers, by Caspar Franssen. The graveyard, which originally surrounded the church, was relocated to its current position, a new choir was installed, a new sacristy and large transepts added. The church, however, remained too small, and the tower and nave were demolished and rebuilt by A. Swinkels between 1935 and 1937.

== Rijksmonument ==
Although the church itself is not a rijksmonument, a part of its inventory is, since April 5, 2005, under the number 33584. Named as part of the monument are the altar rails, pulpit, organ and two confessionals. The inventory is dated between 1500 and 1949 and is considered national heritage due to "very high cultural historic value".

== Gallery of images ==
Exterior
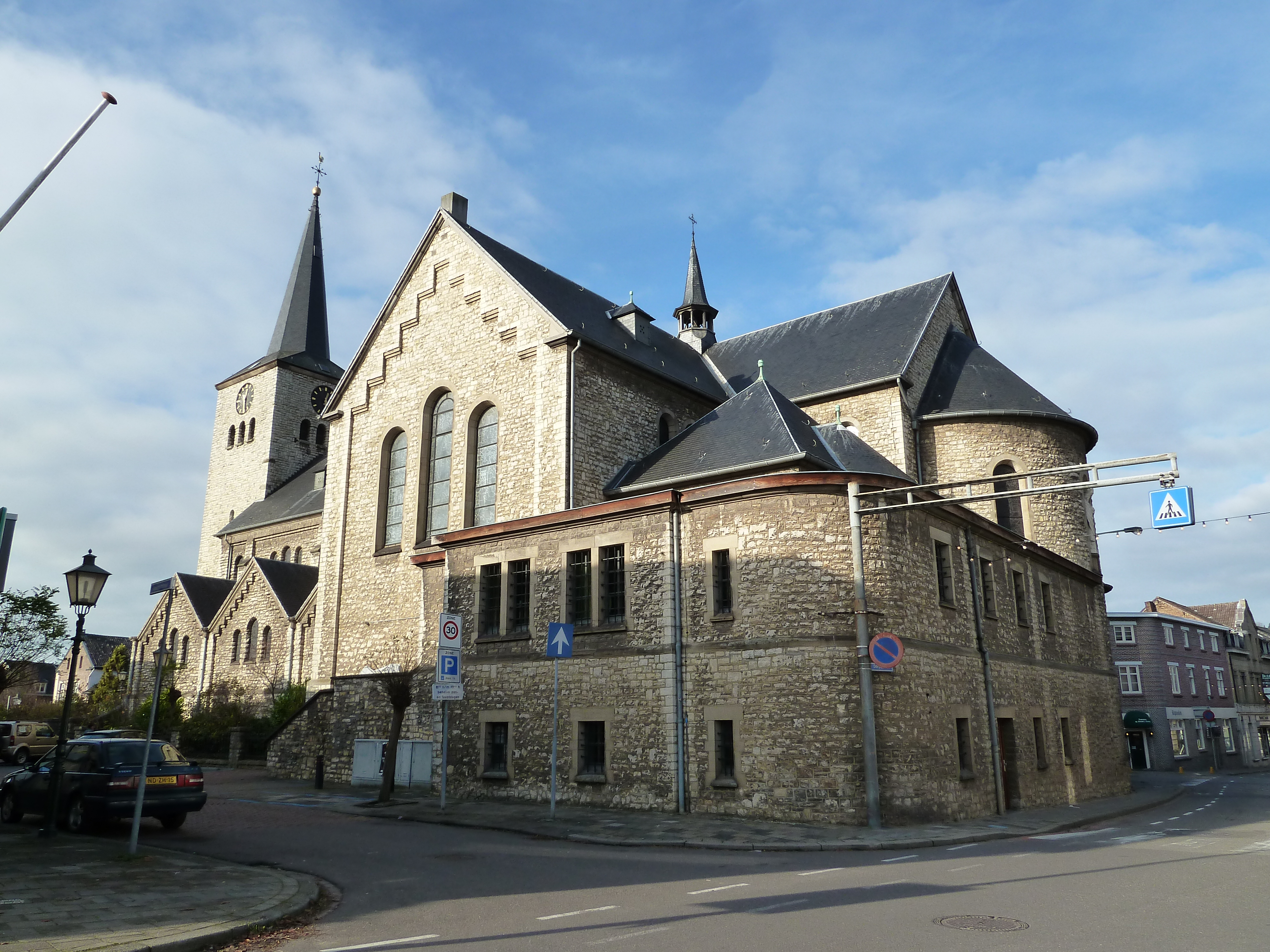
View from East

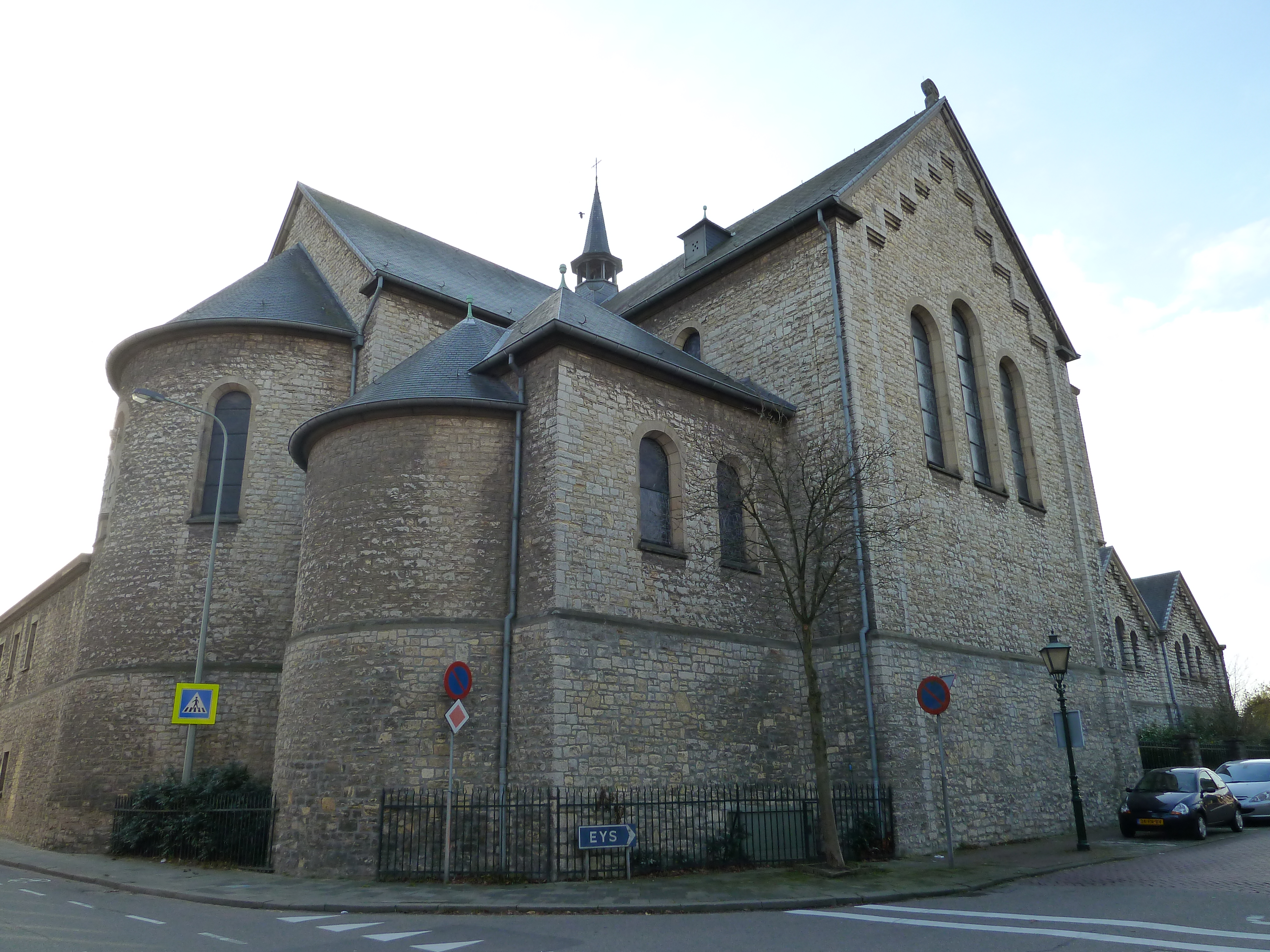
View from North

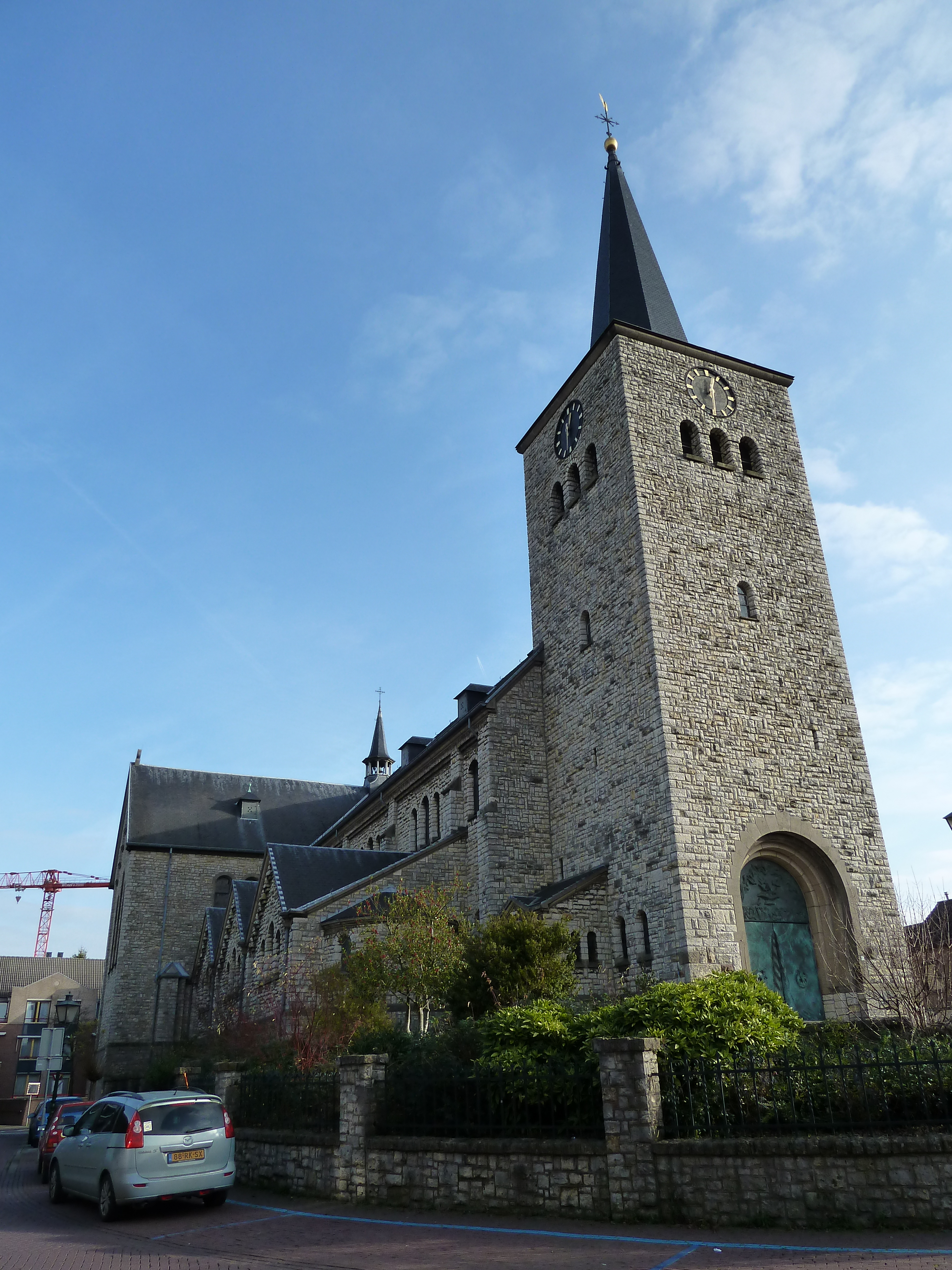
View from West

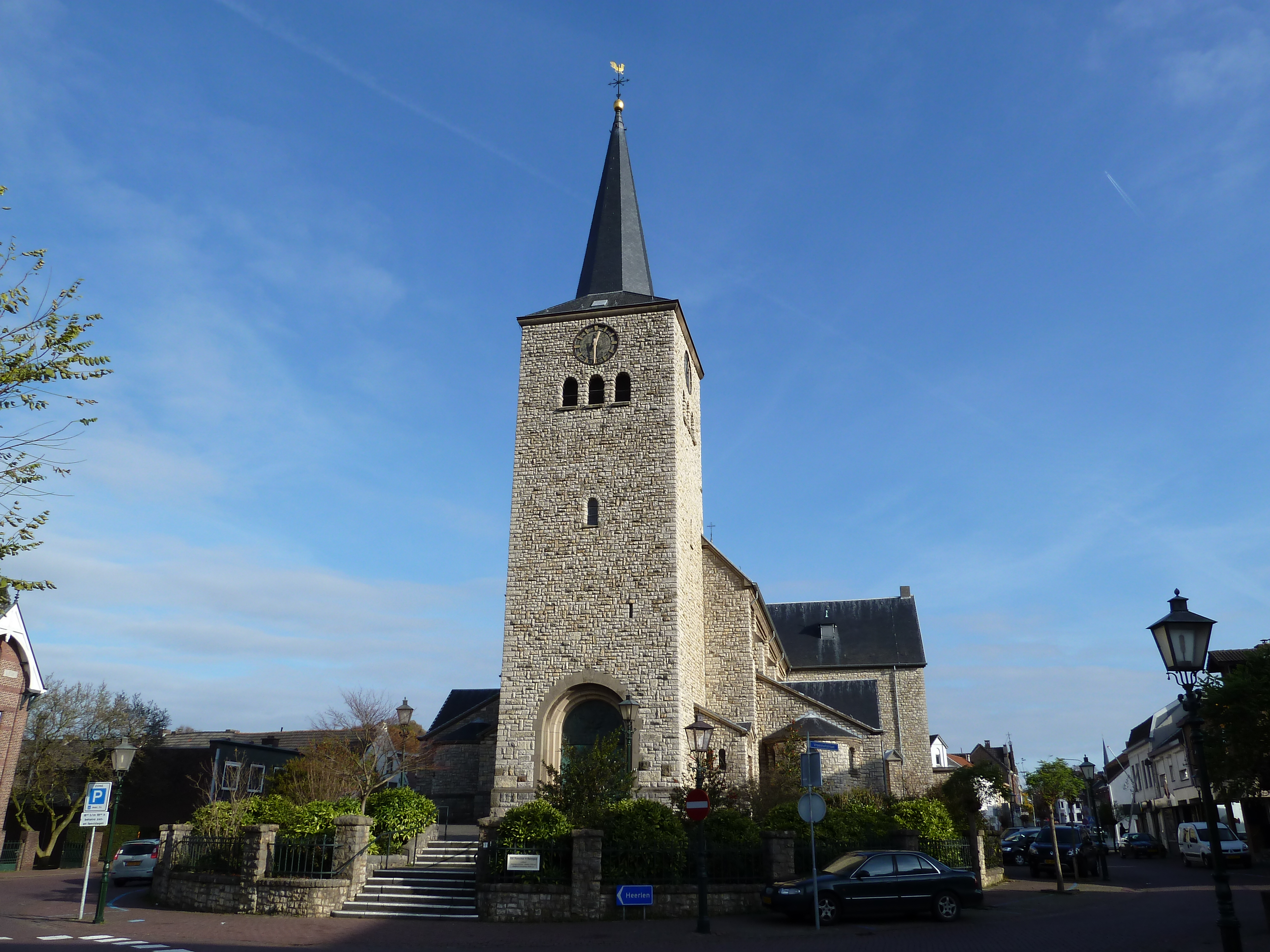
View from South-West
Interior
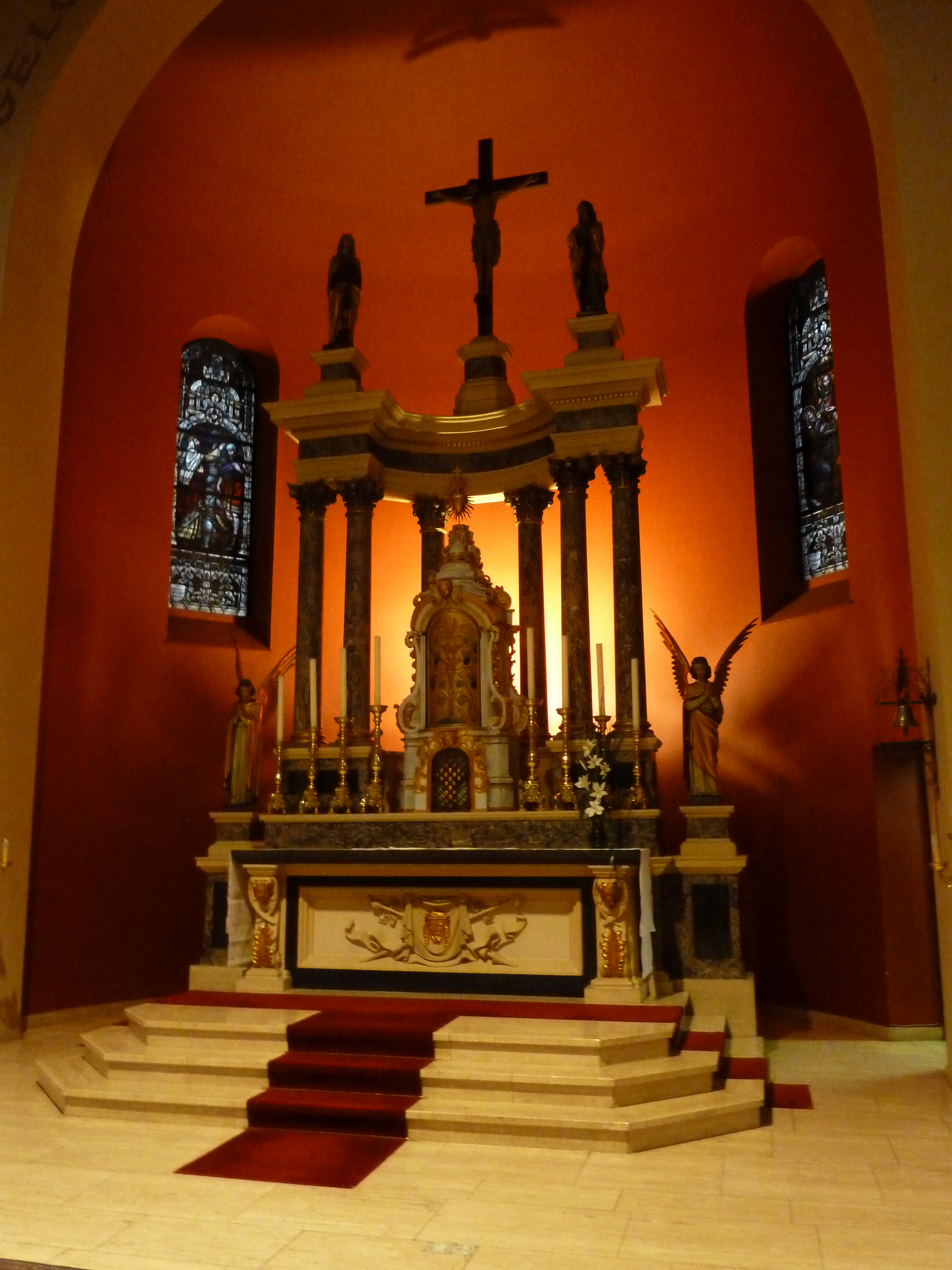
Altar

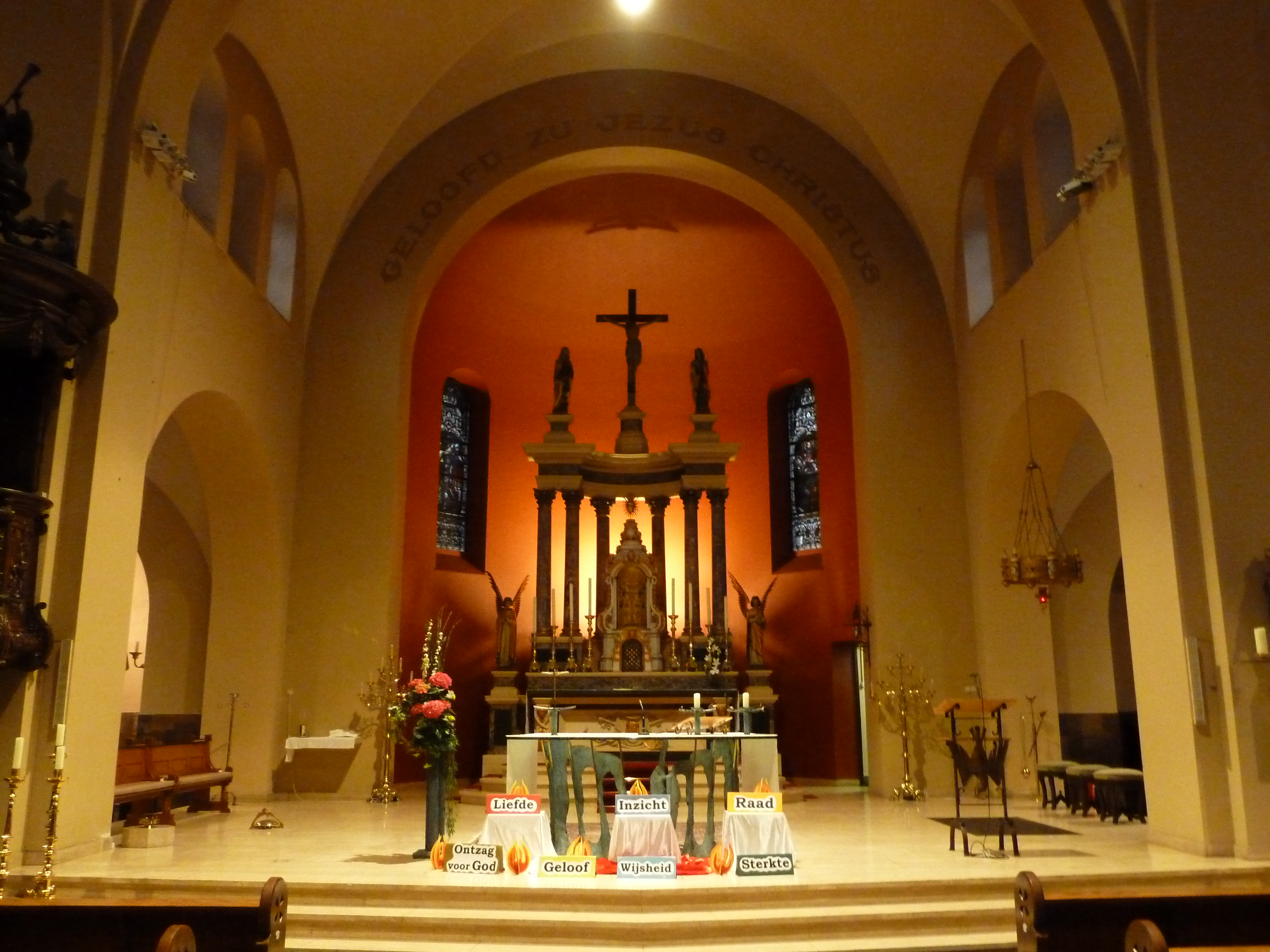
Choir

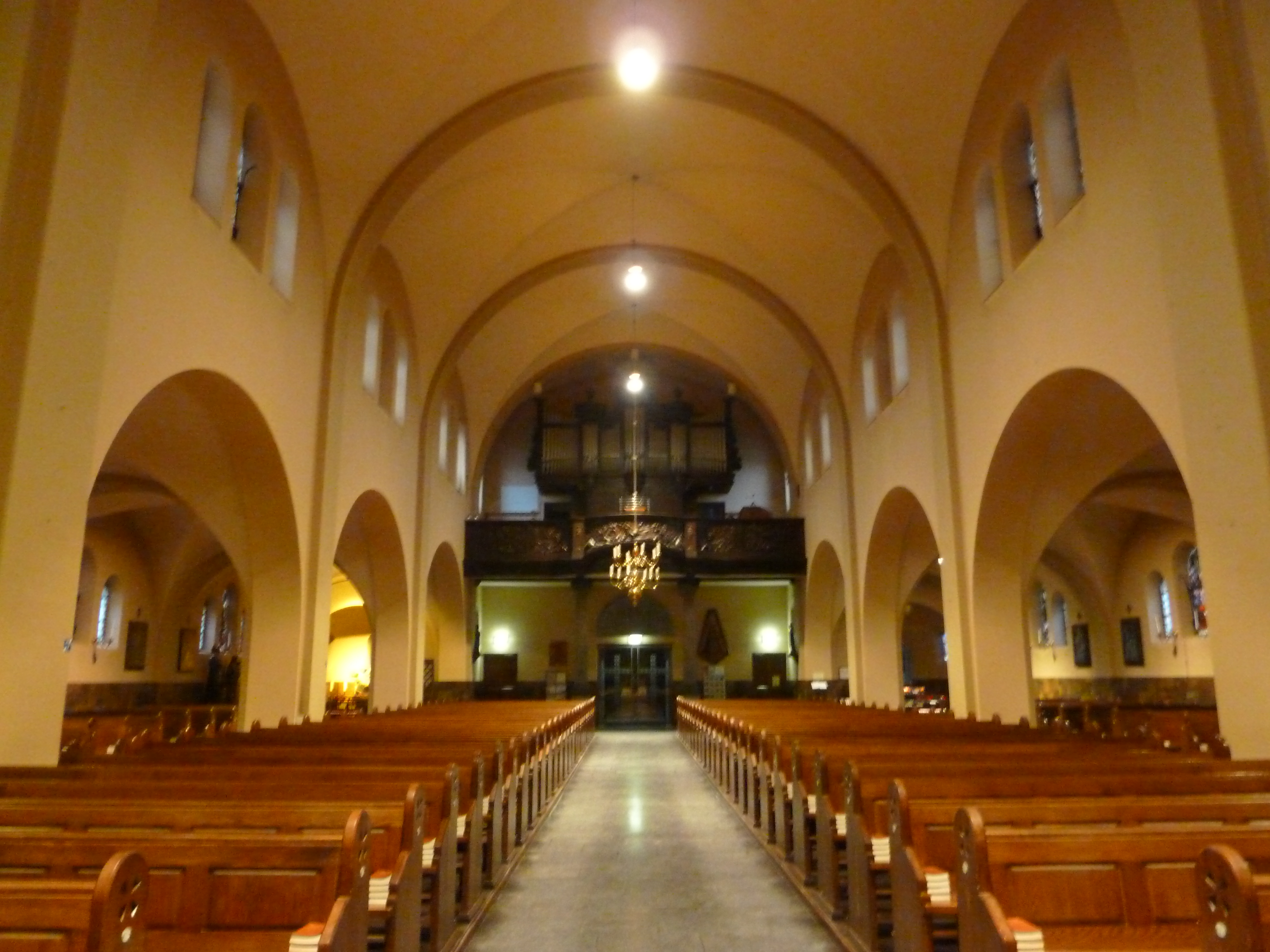
Nave

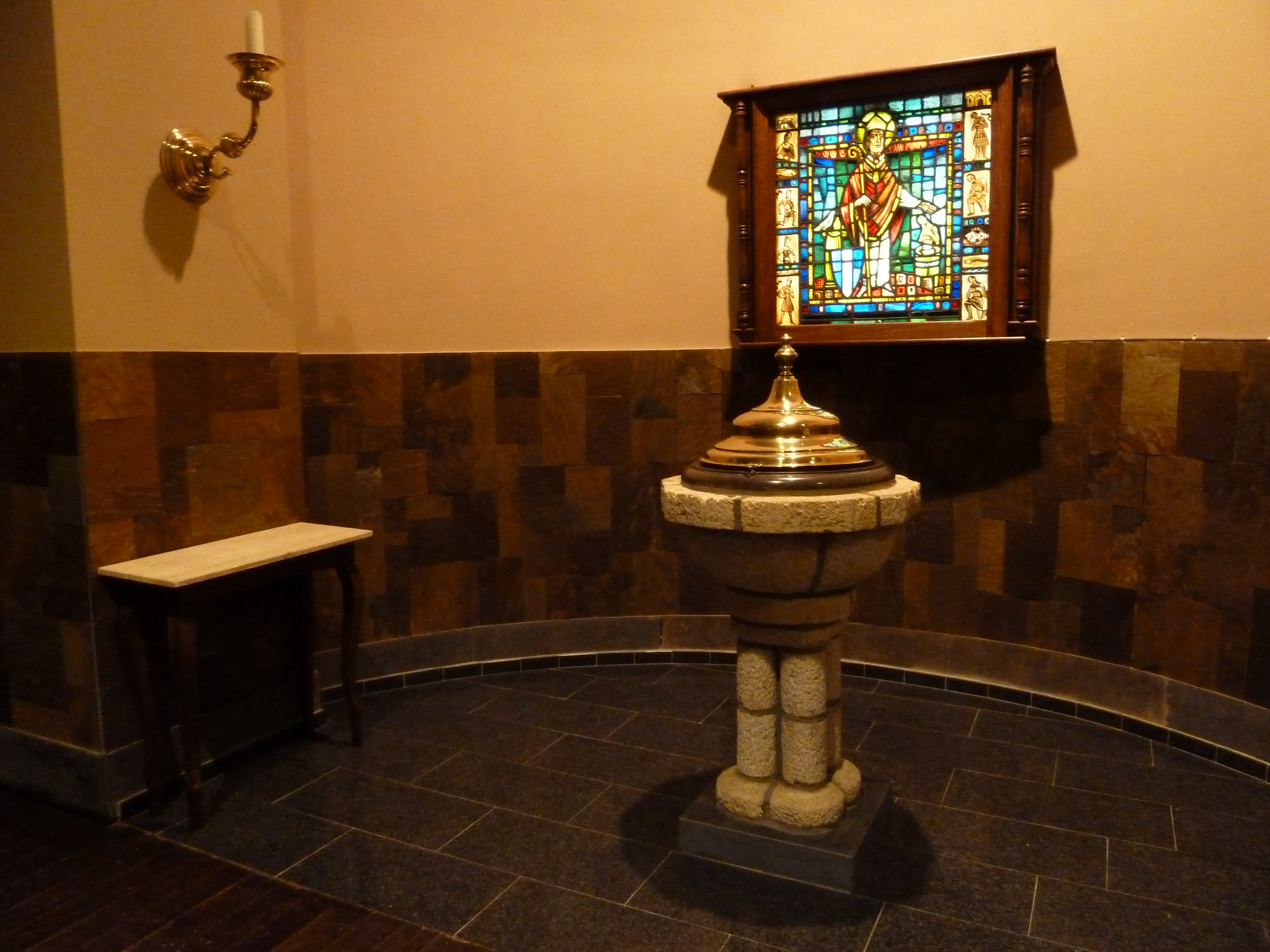
Baptismal font

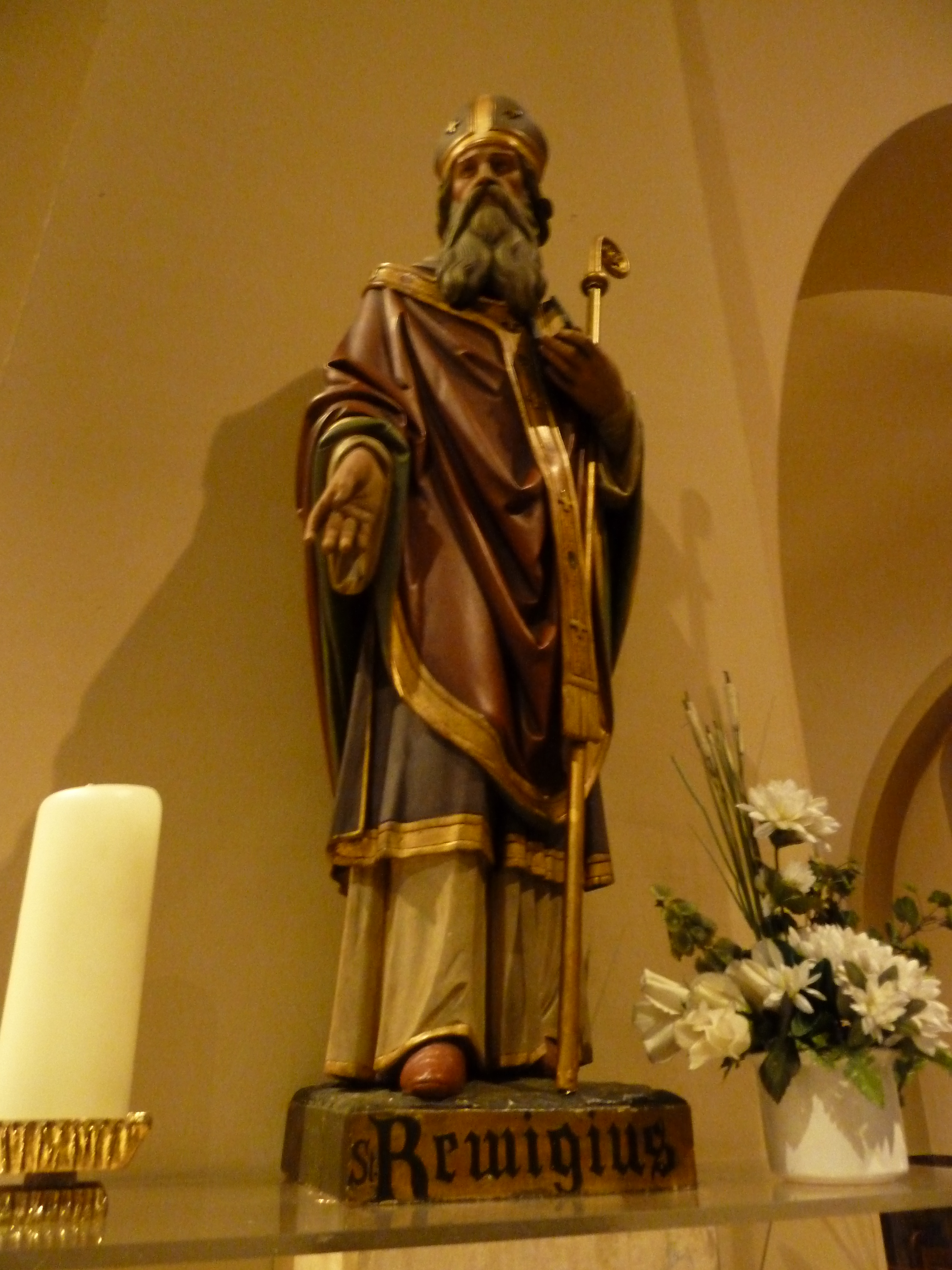
Statue of Saint Remigius

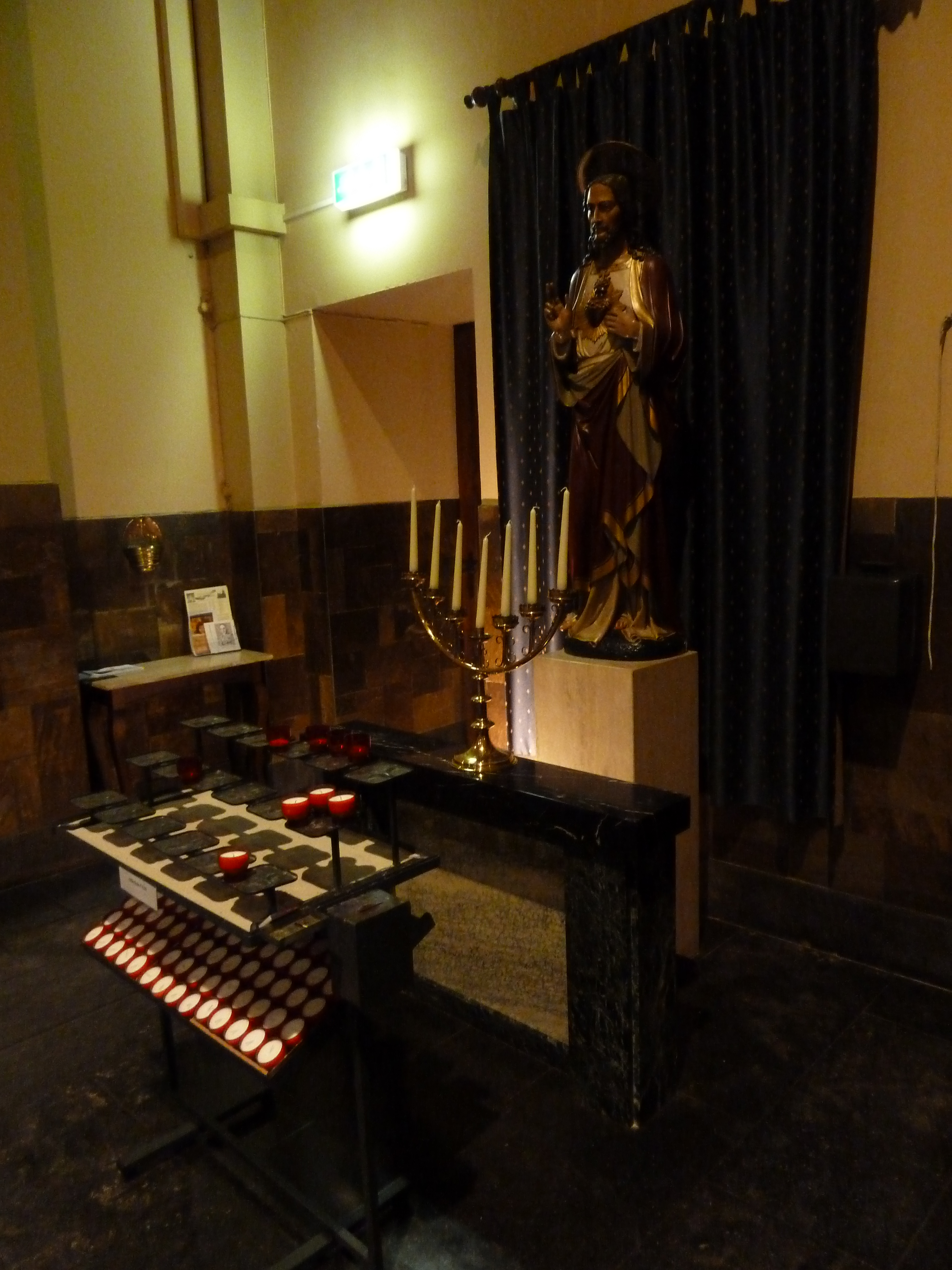
Sacred Heart of Jesus altar

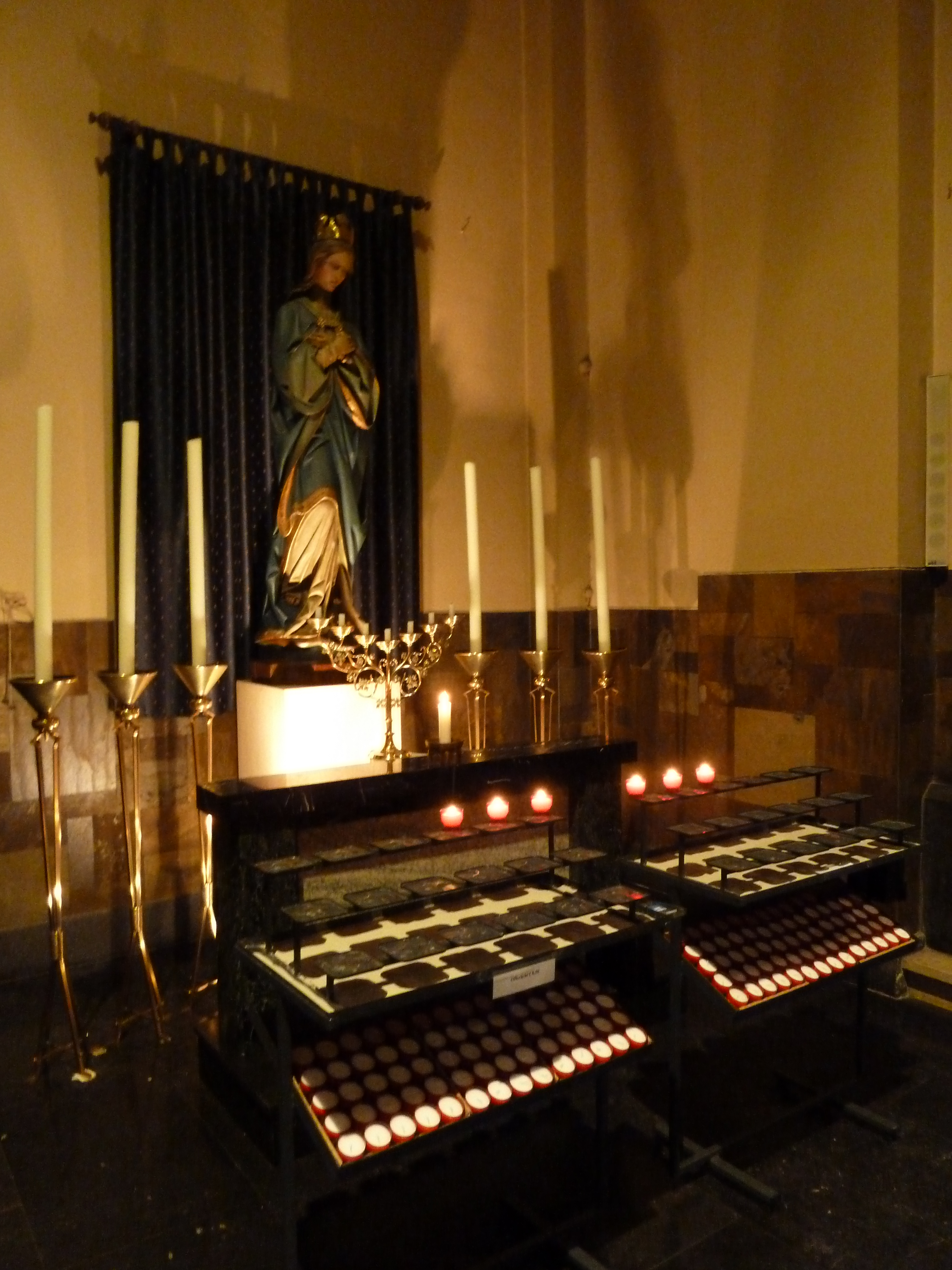
Mary altar

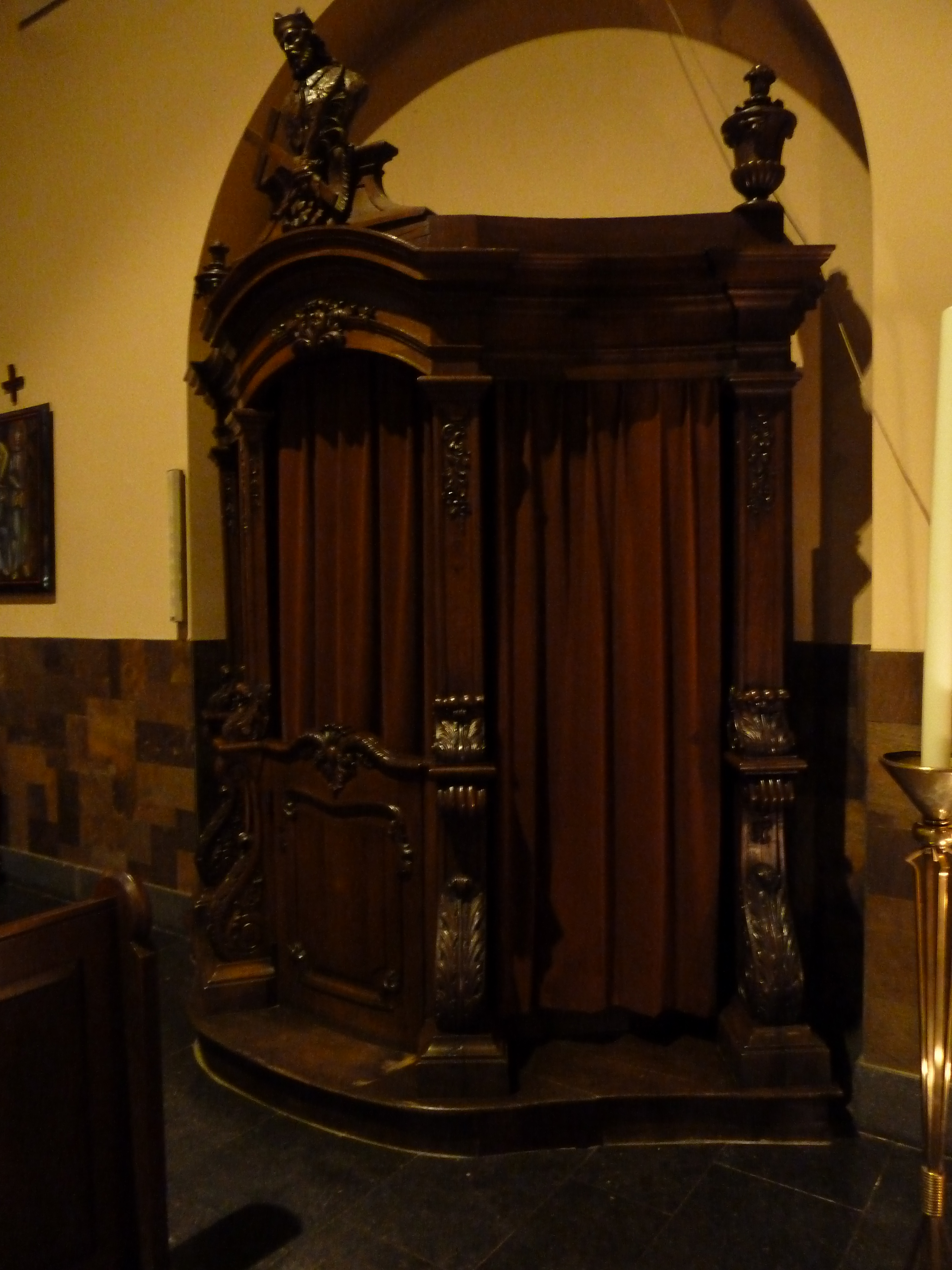
Confessional on the north side

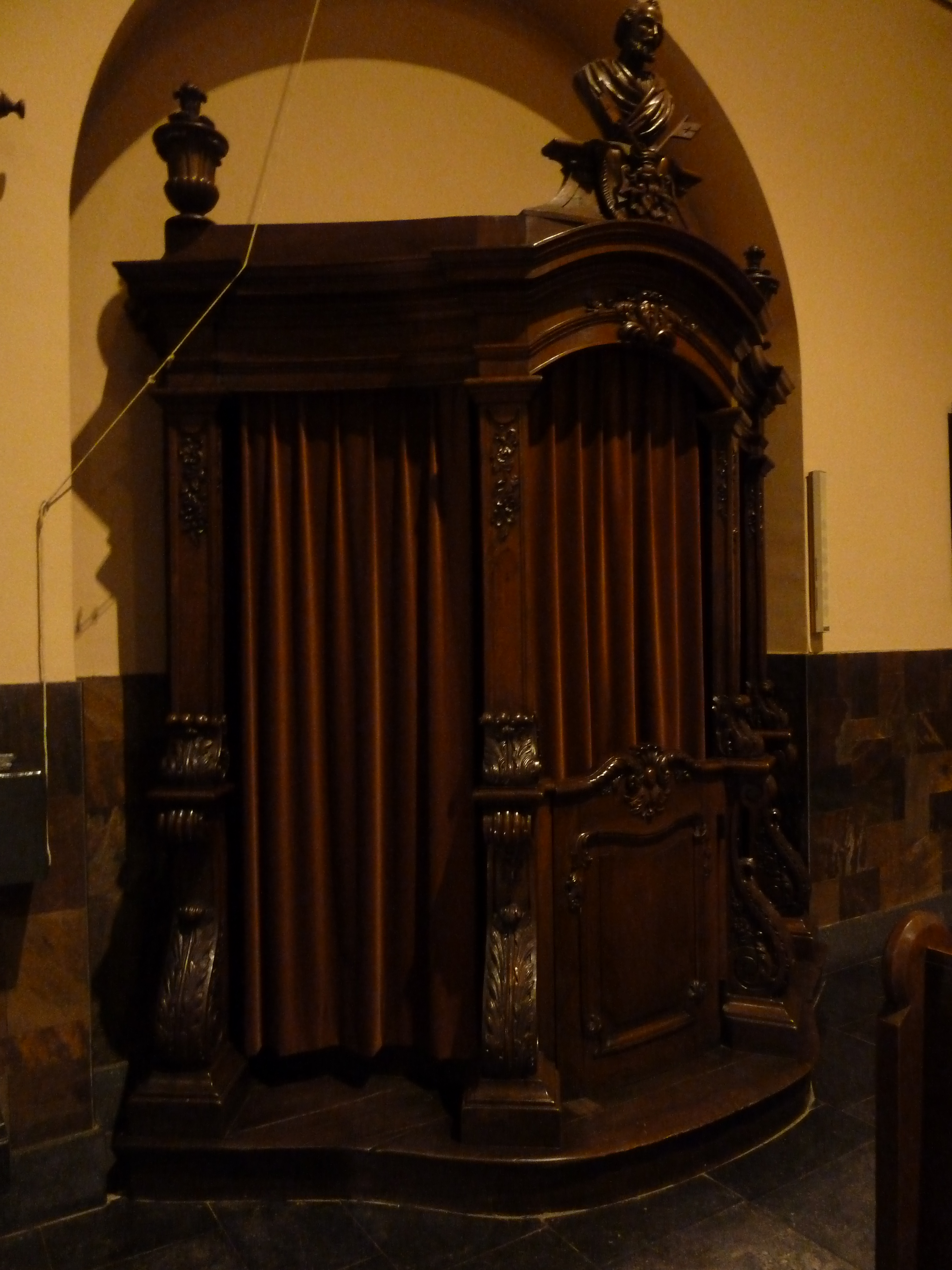
Confessional on the south side

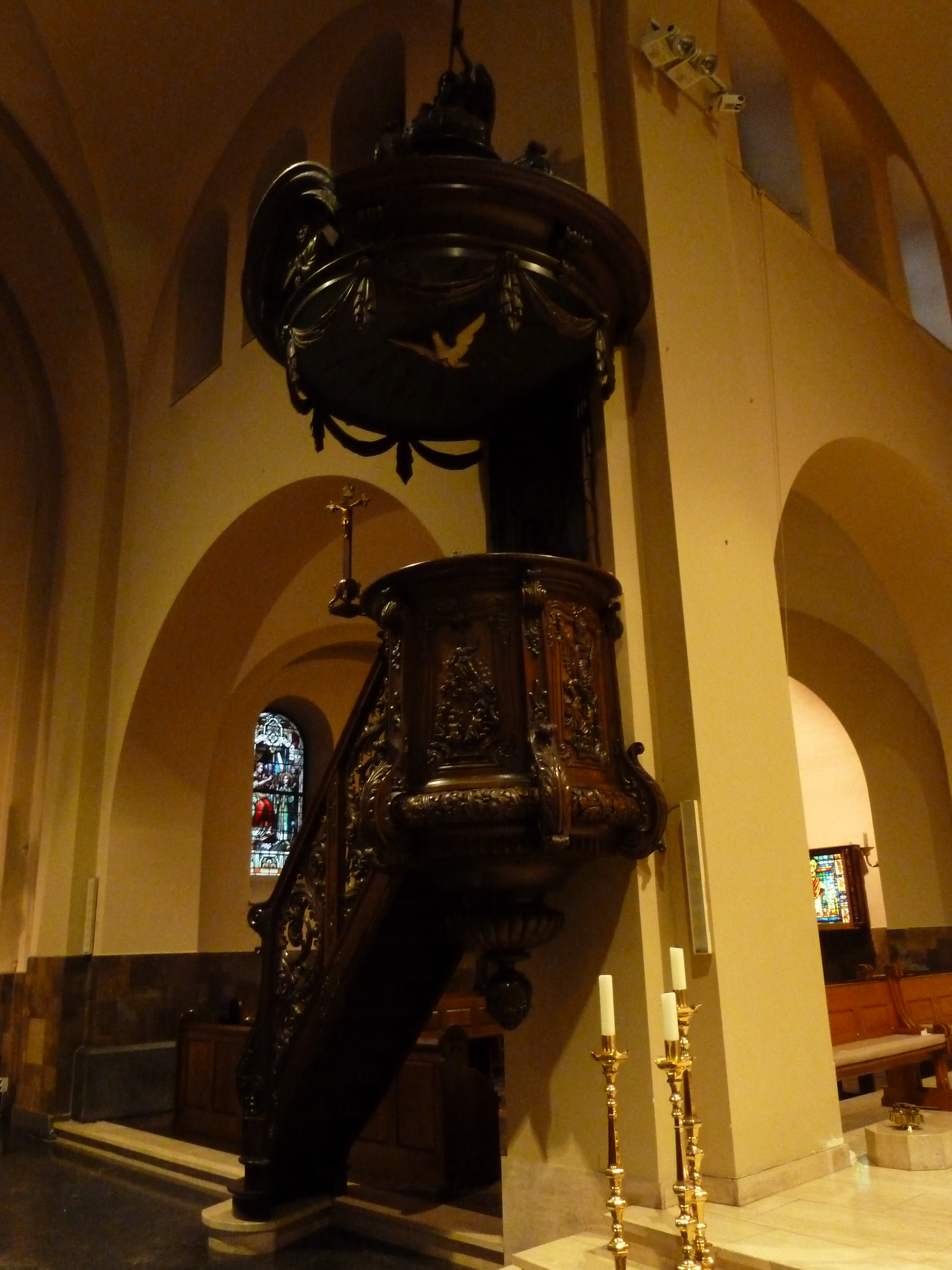
Pulpit

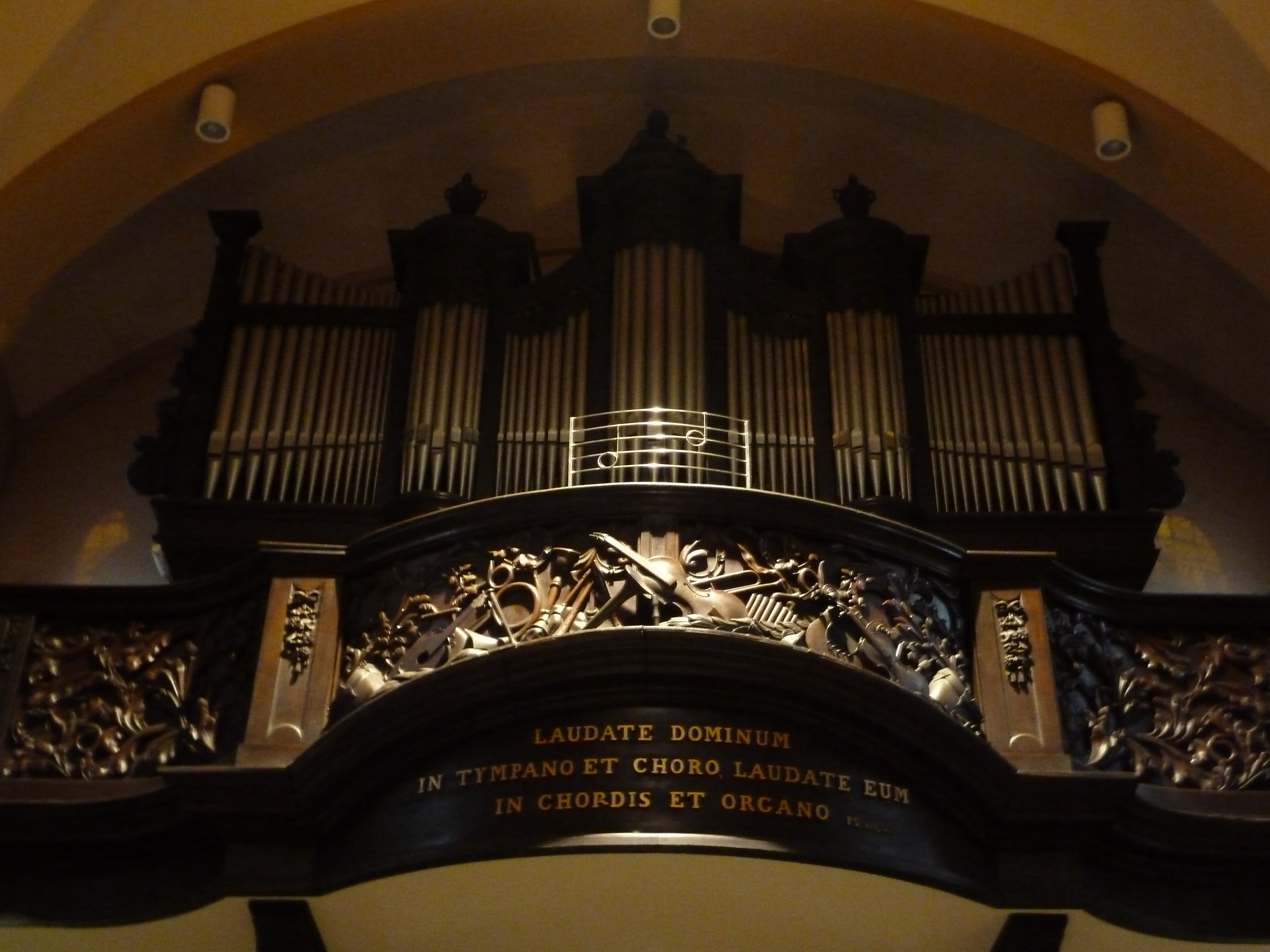
Organ
Windows
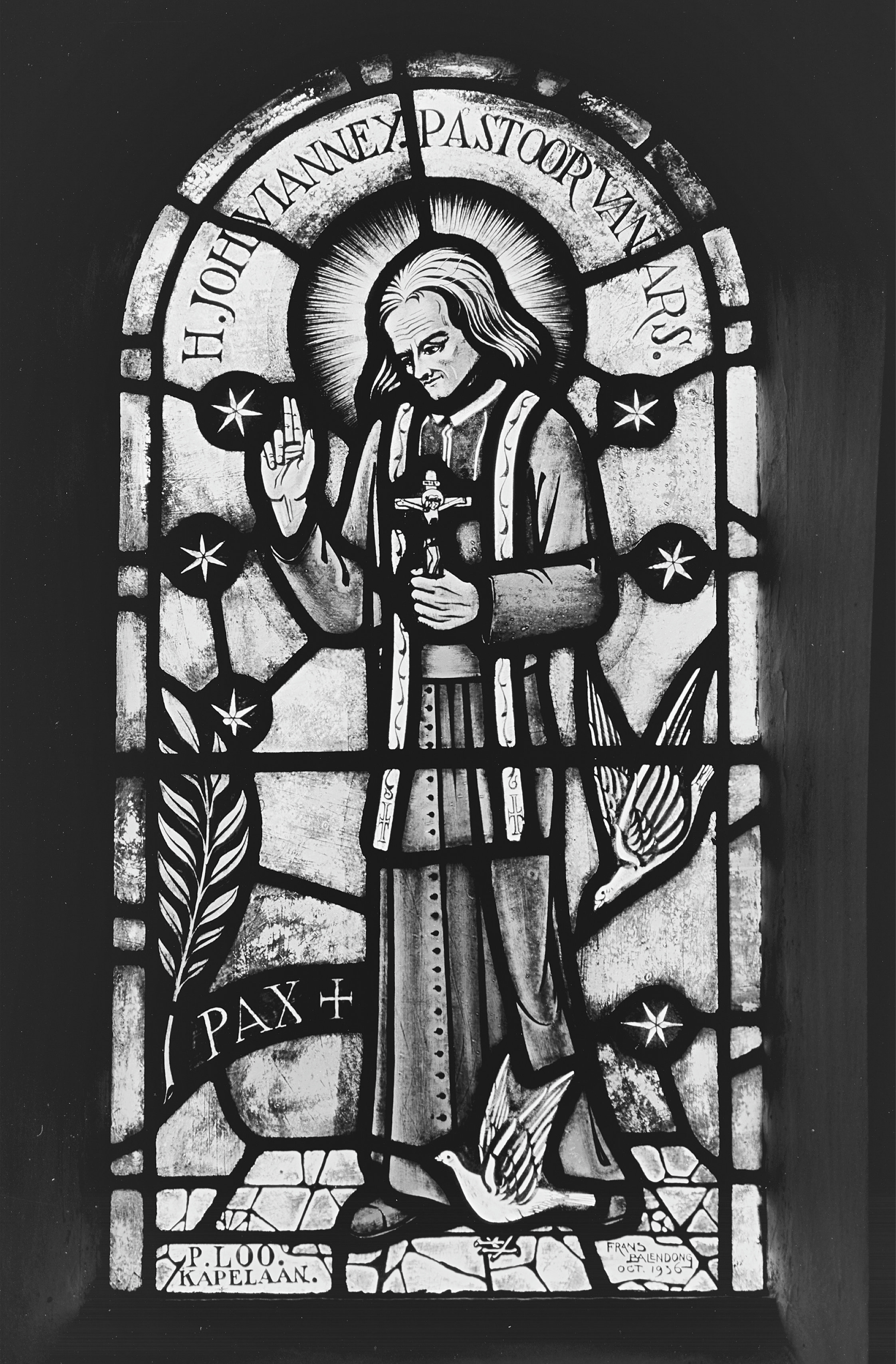

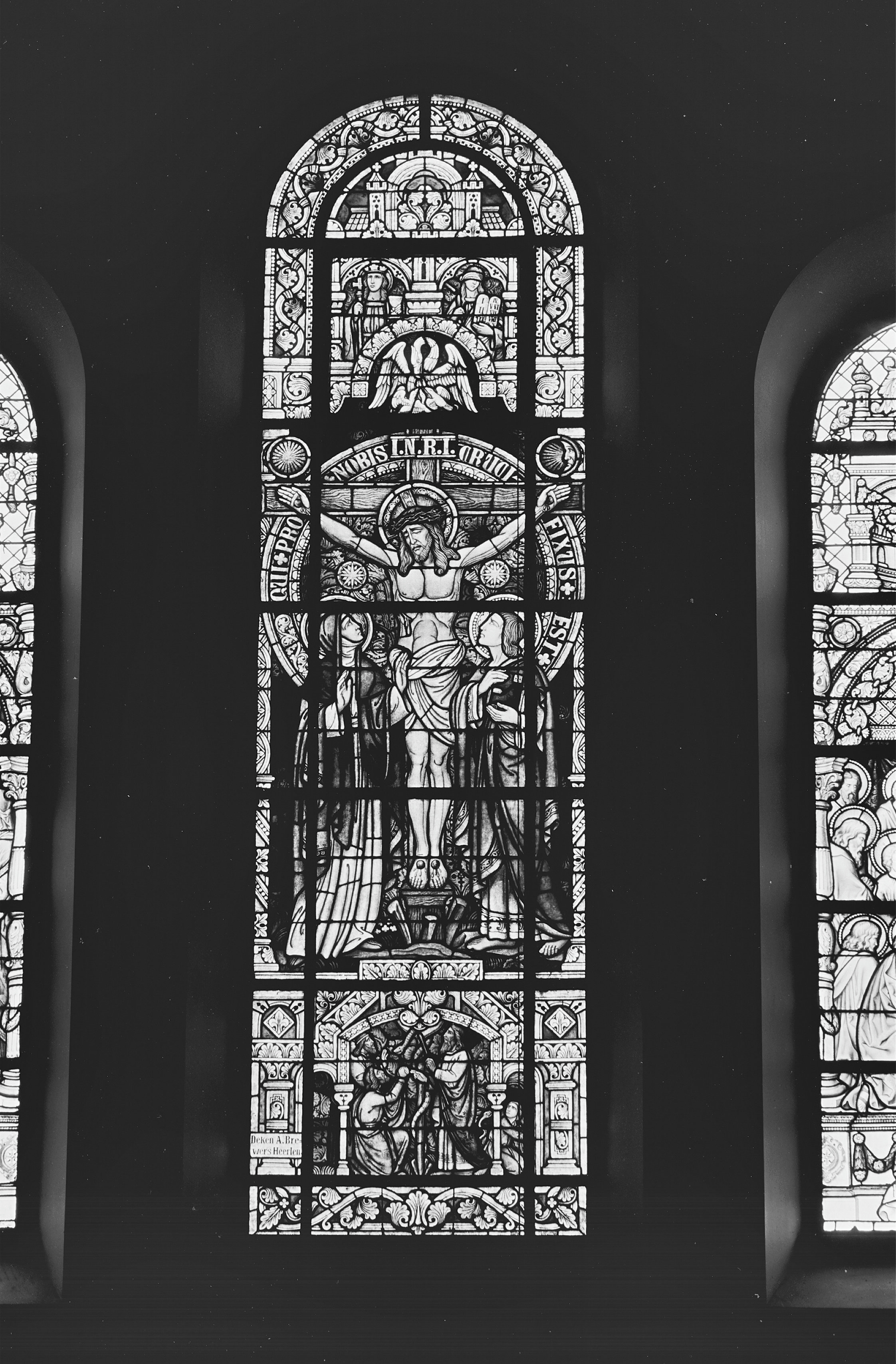

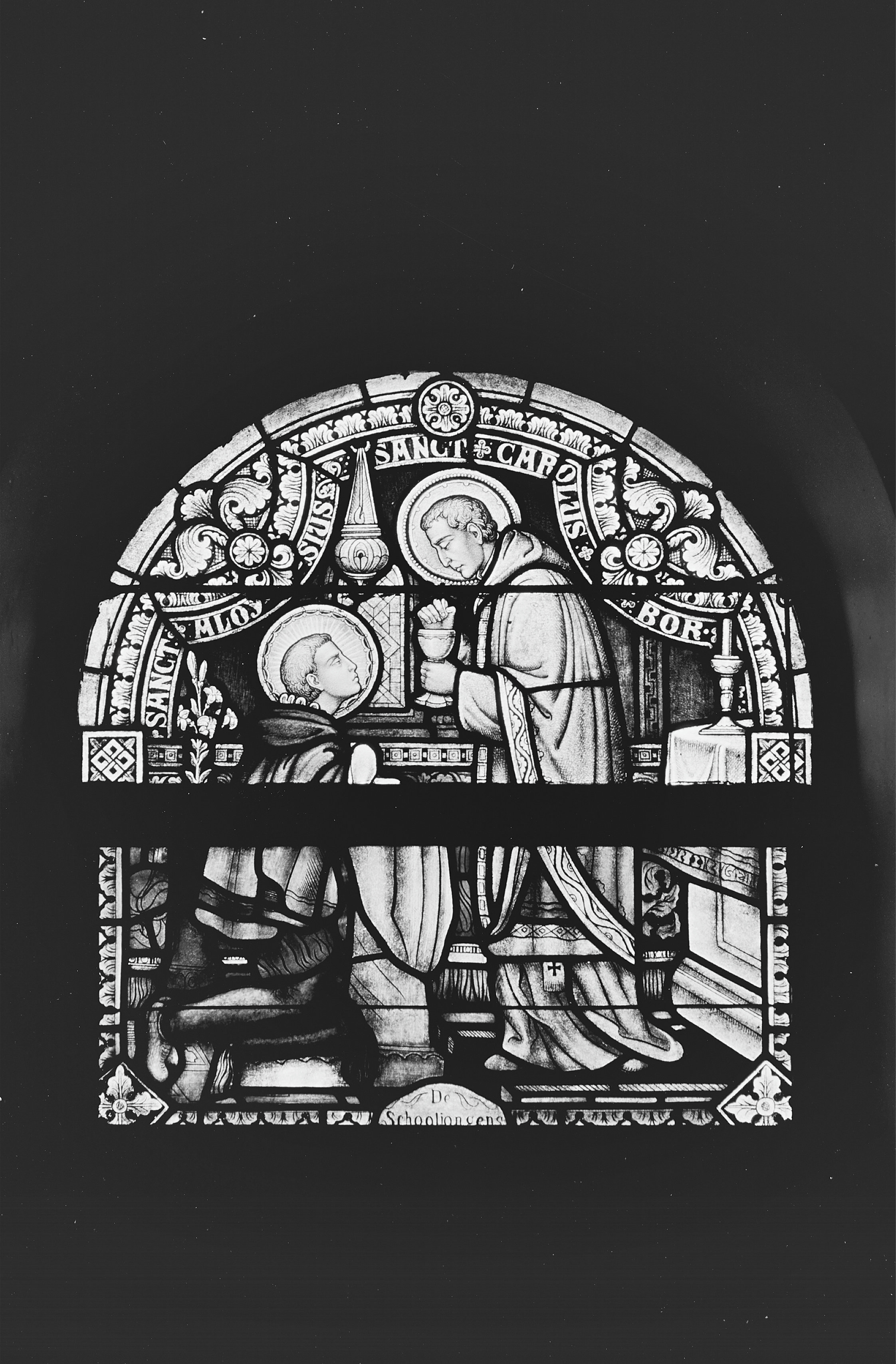

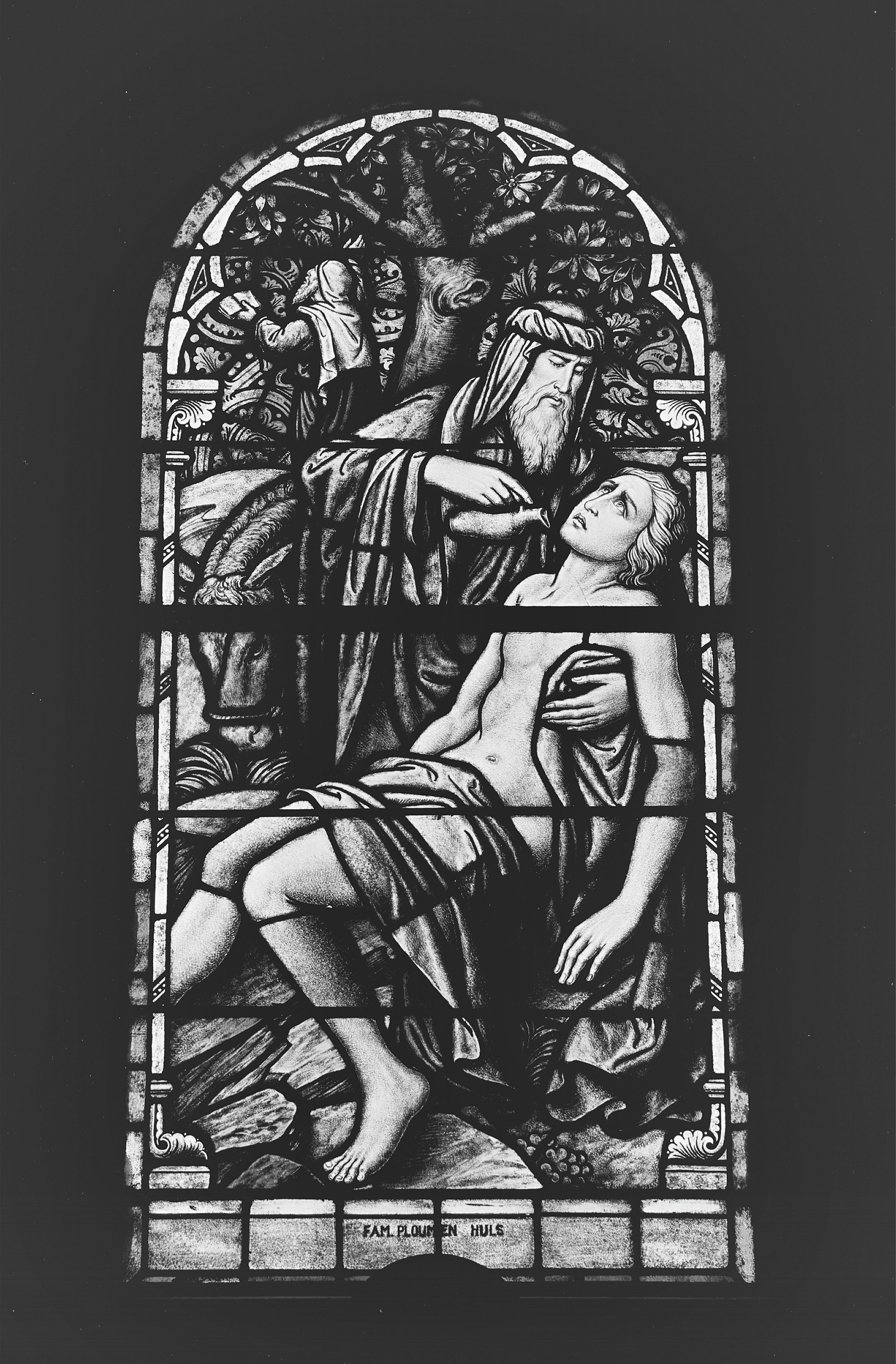
Design
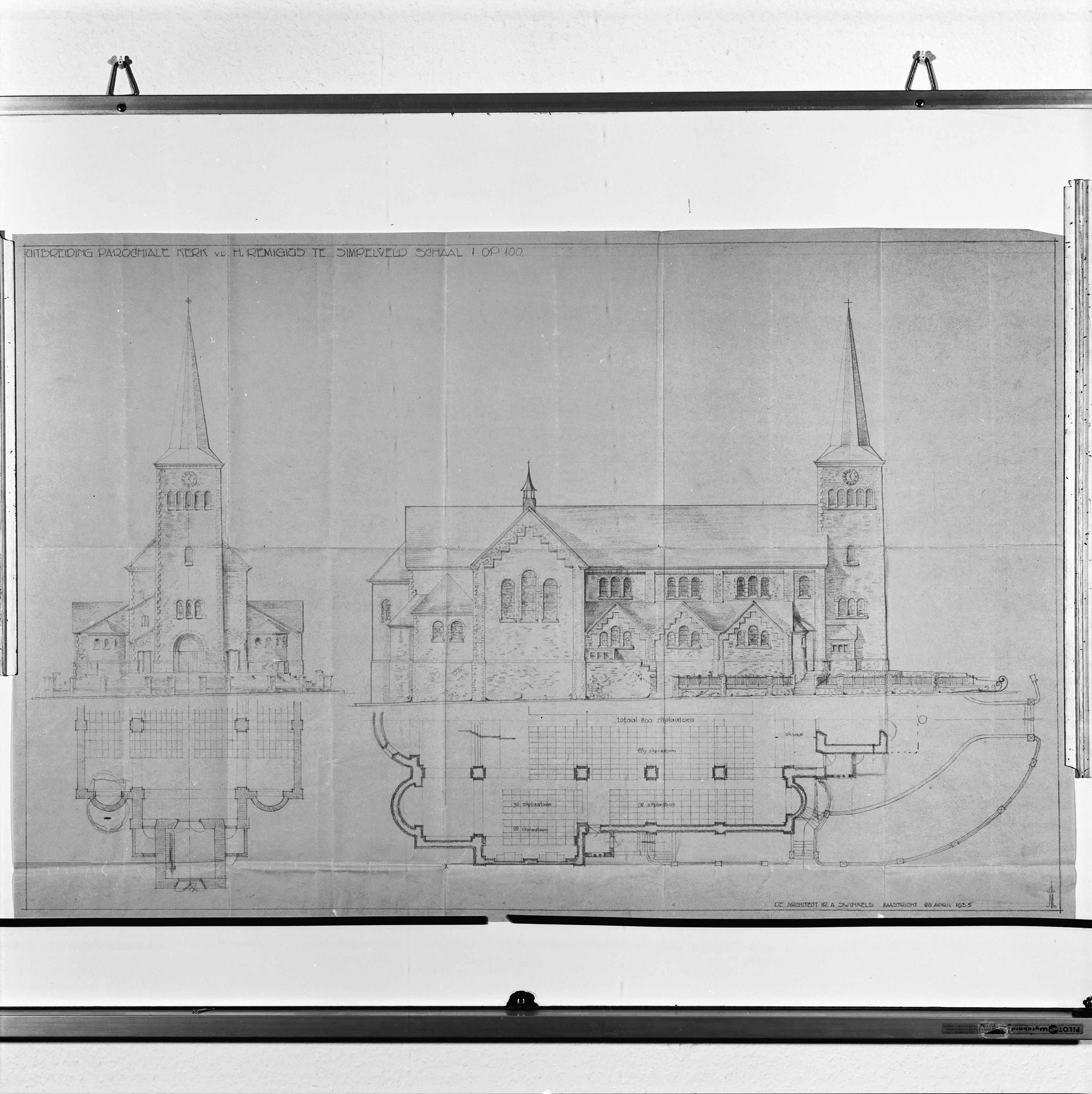
Design southwing and plan, bureau Swinkels, 1933

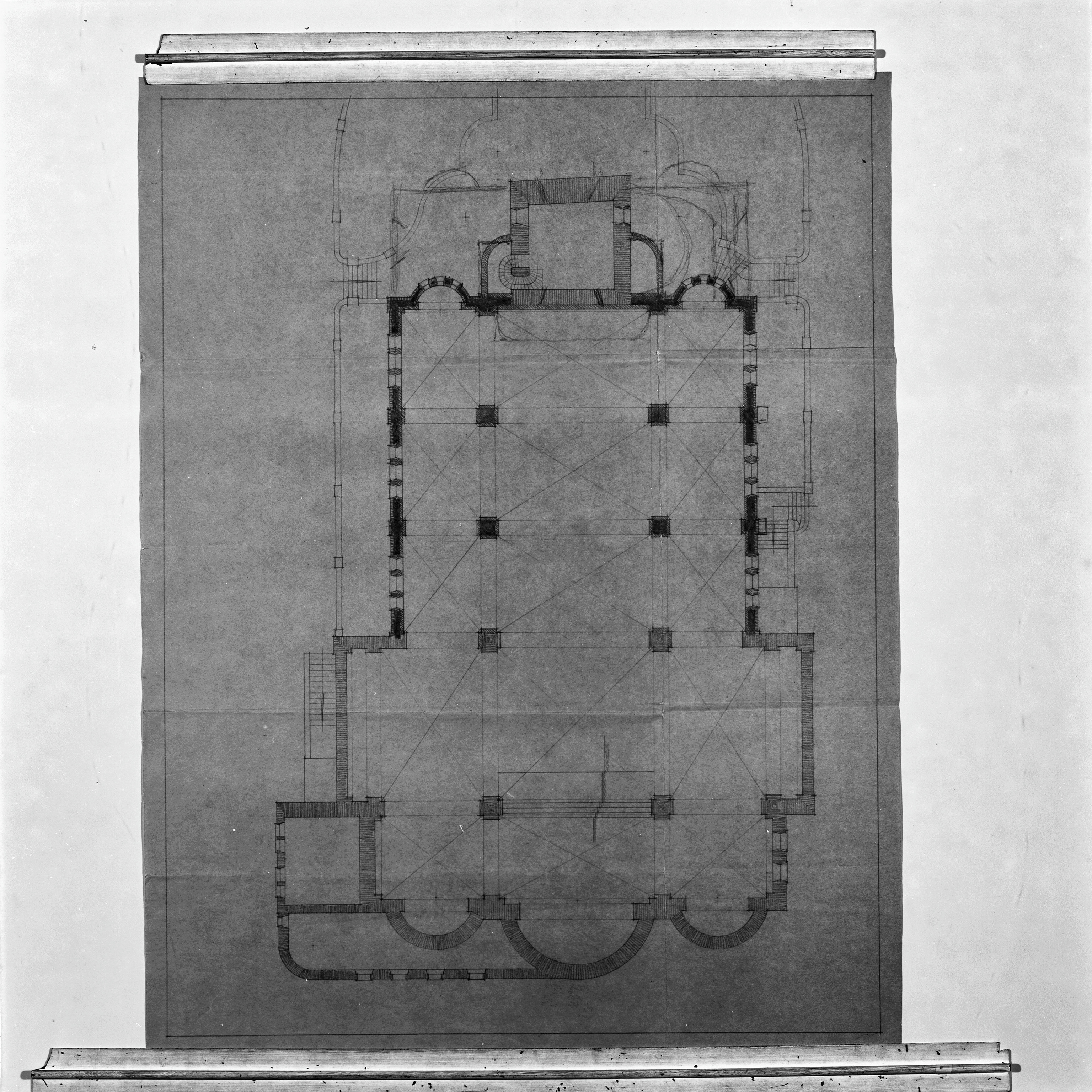
Plan

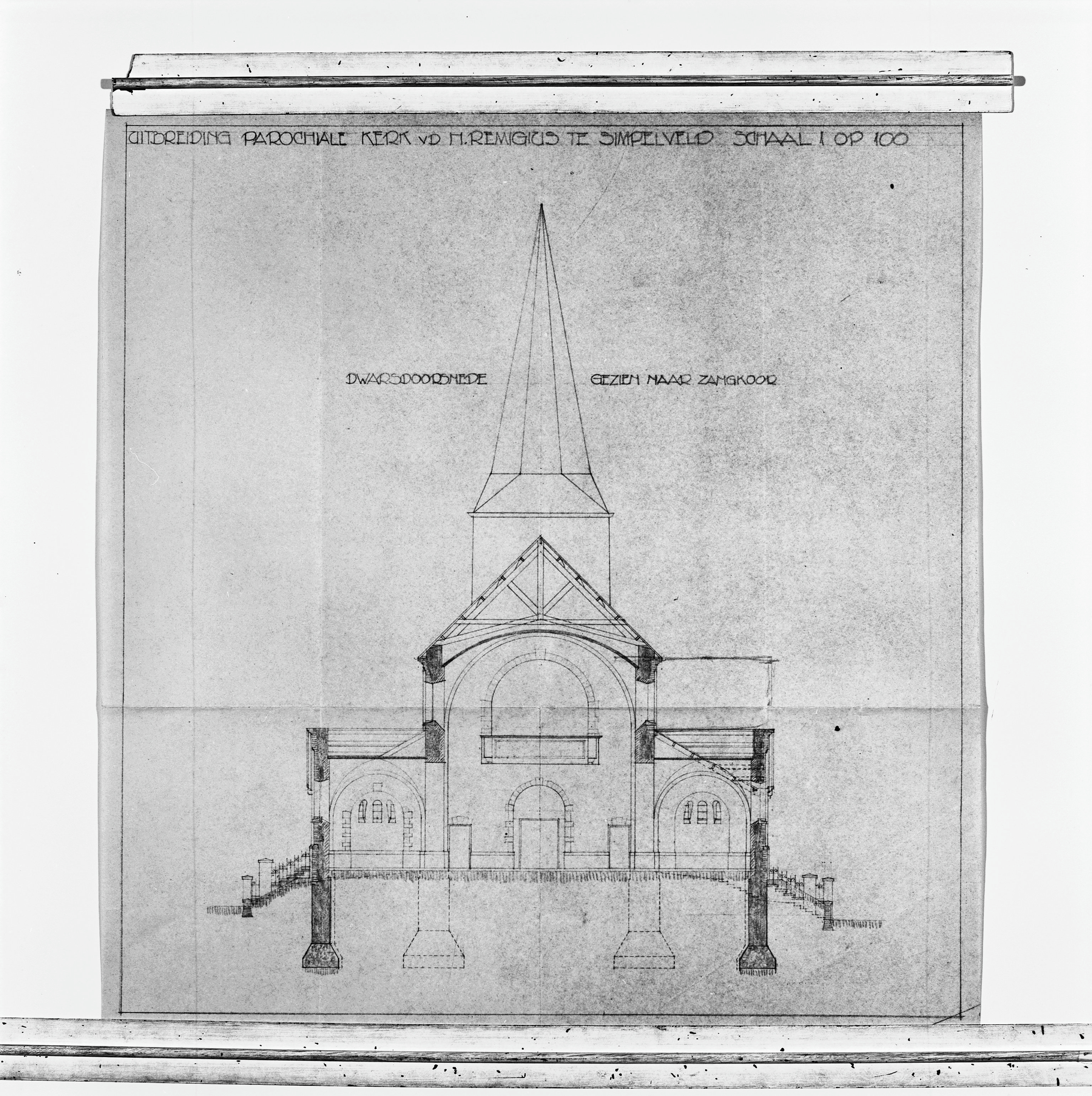
Crosssection of the nave

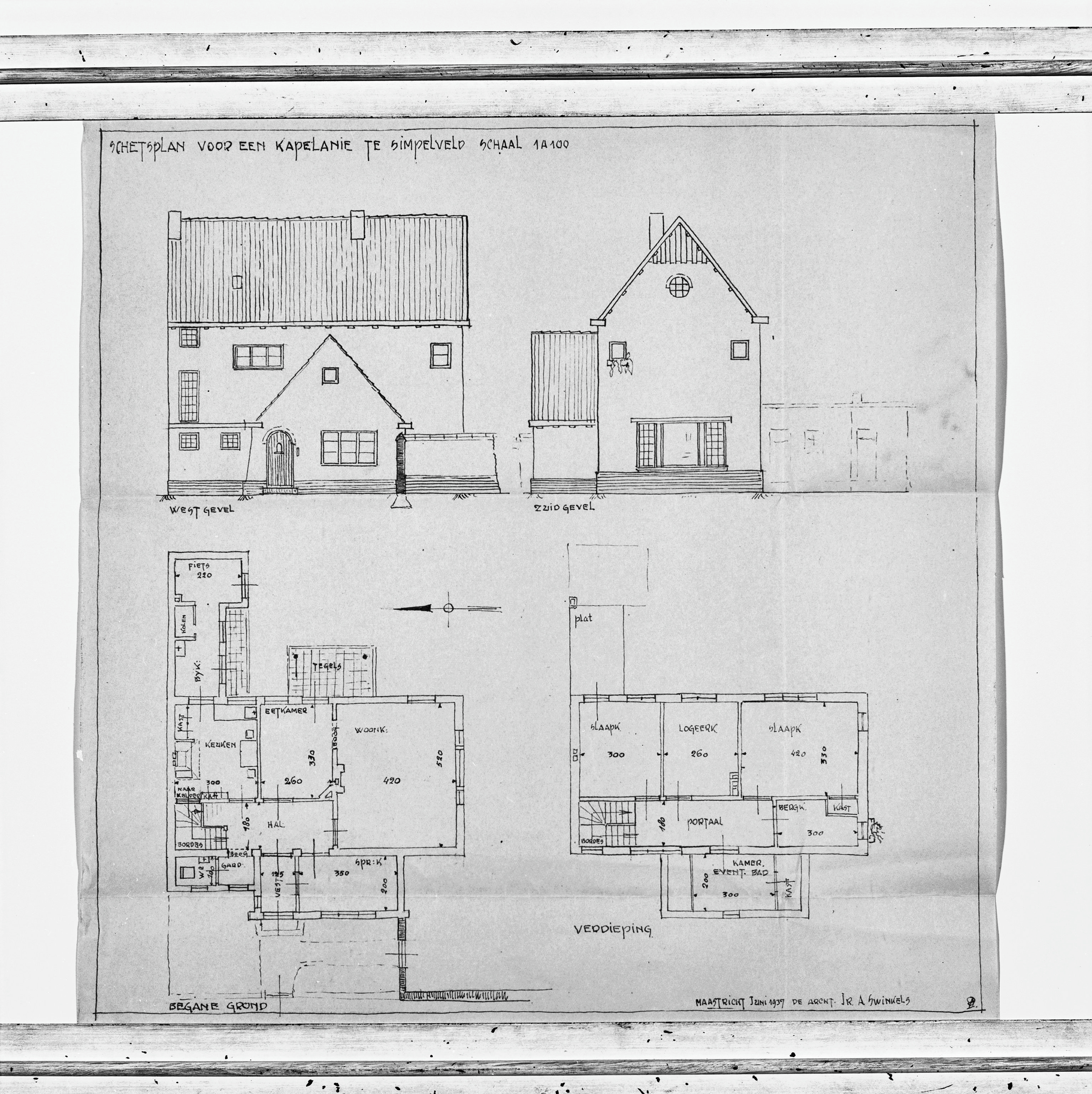
Design clergy house, 1937
