= Éric de Moulins-Beaufort =

French prelate of the Catholic Church (born 1962)

The Most Reverend Éric de Moulins-Beaufort
- Archbishop of Reims
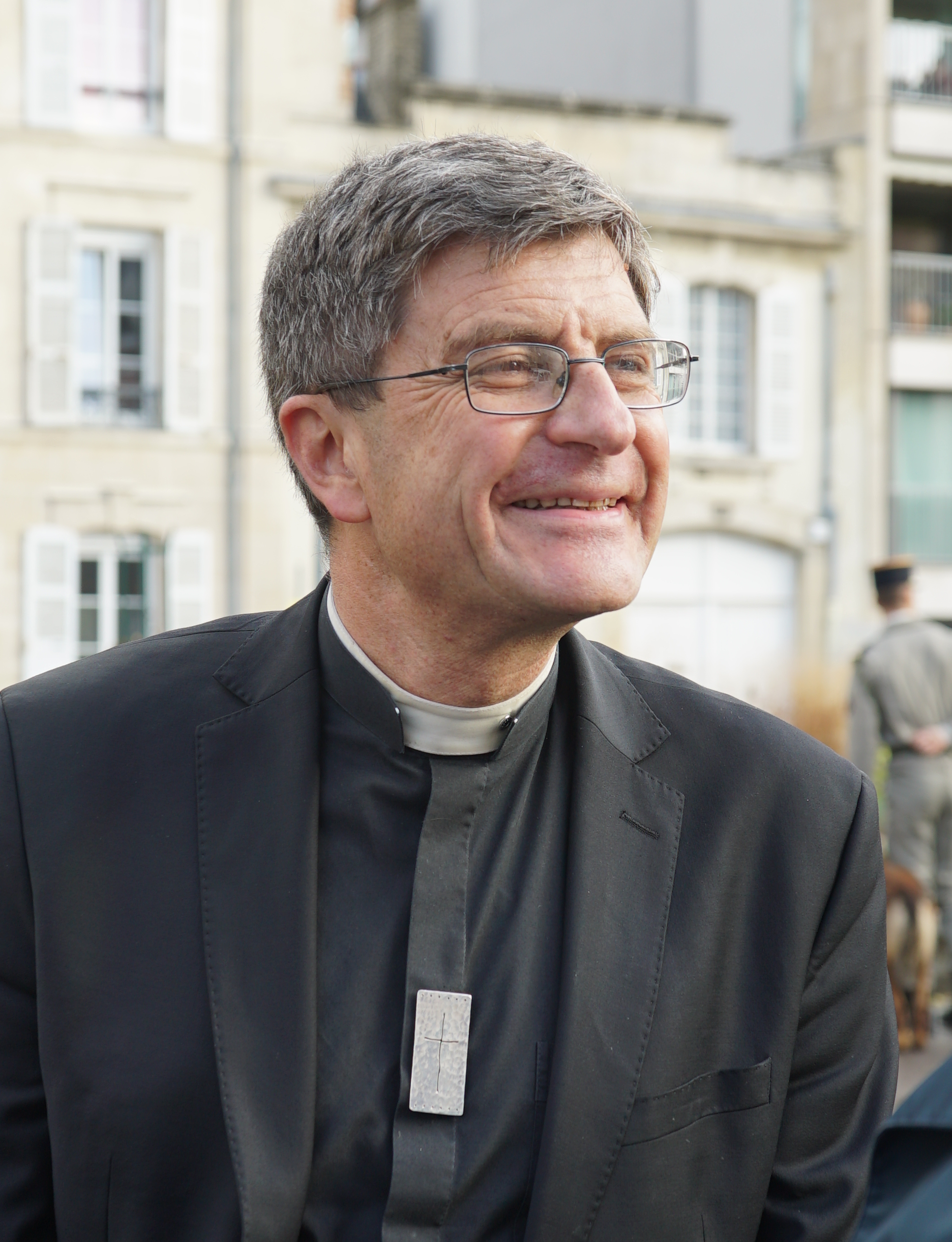
- Moulins-Beaufort on 11 November 2018 in Reims.
- Church: Roman Catholic Church
- Archdiocese: Reims
- See: Reims
- Appointed: 18 August 2018
- Installed: 28 October 2018
- Predecessor: Thierry Romain Camille Jordan
- Previous posts: Titular Bishop of Cresima (2008–2018); Auxiliary Bishop of Paris (2008–2018); President of the French Episcopal Conference (2019–2025)

Orders
- Ordination: 29 June 1991 by Jean-Marie Lustiger
- Consecration: 5 September 2008 by André Armand Vingt-Trois

Personal details
- Born: Éric Marie de Moulins d'Amieu de Beaufort; 30 January 1962 (age 64) Landau in der Pfalz, West Germany
- Education: Sciences Po; University of Paris II Panthéon-Assas; Pontifical French Seminary
- Motto: Il entrera et il sortira
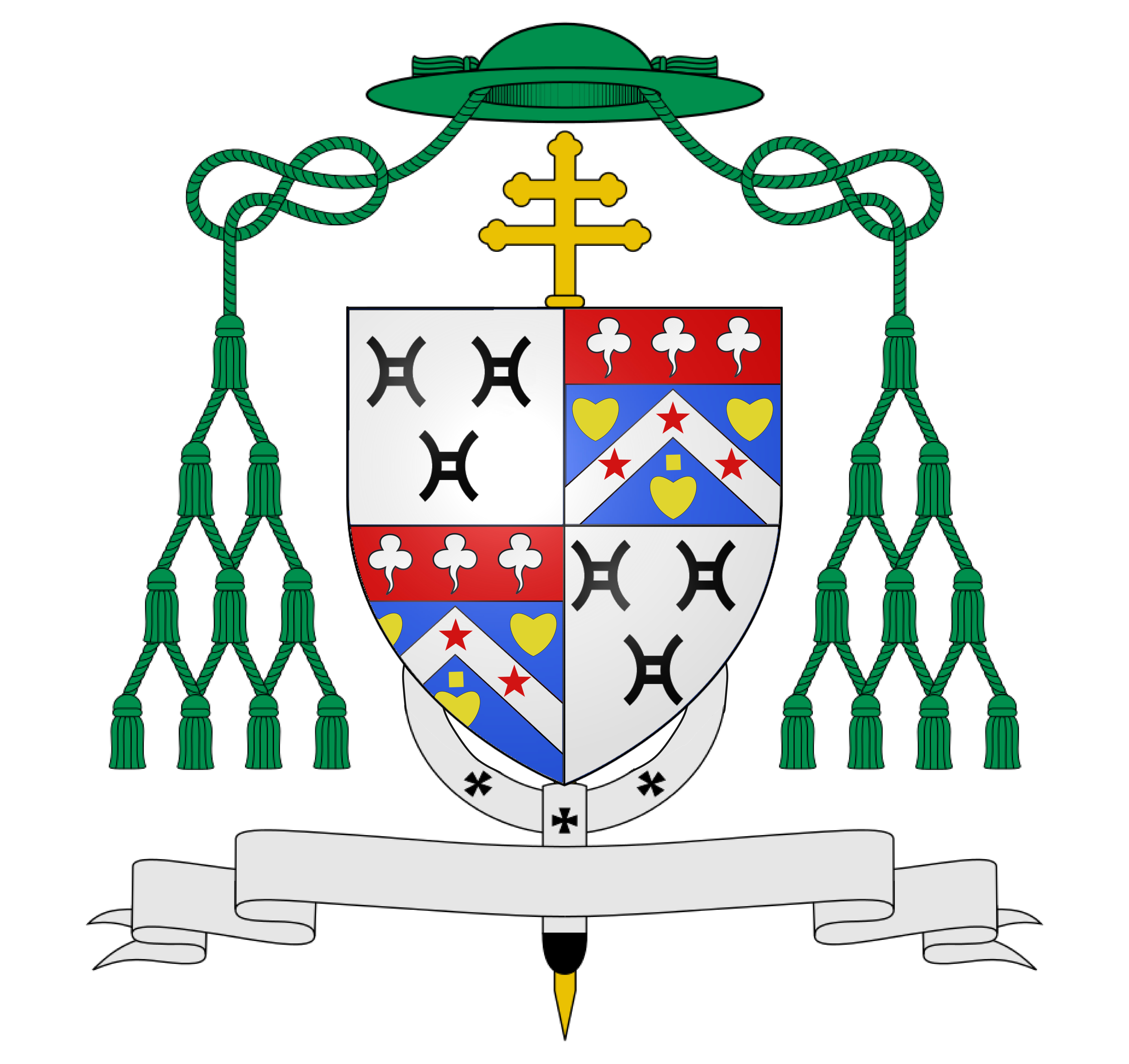
- Coat of arms: Éric de Moulins-Beaufort's coat of arms

Éric de Moulins-Beaufort (French pronunciation: [eʁik də mulɛ̃ bofɔʁ]; born 30 January 1962) is a French prelate of the Catholic Church who has been a bishop since 2008 and the Archbishop of Reims since 2018. He was elected president of the Bishops' Conference of France in 2019.

== Life ==
Éric de Moulins-Beaufort was born on 30 January 1962 in Landau in der Pfalz, Germany. Descended from a noble family, his full name is Éric Marie de Moulins d'Amieu de Beaufort.

He completed his studies at the University of Economics Paris II, obtaining a degree in economics, and at the Institut d'Etudes Politiques in Paris, obtaining a diploma in political sciences. He entered the seminary, attended the Institut d'Etudes Théologiques in Brussels, then continued his studies in Rome, obtaining a licentiate in theology. He completed his studies at the Institut Catholique of Toulouse, gaining a doctorate with a thesis entitled "L'esprit de l'homme" ou la présence de Dieu en l'homme: Anthropologie et mystique selon Henri de Lubac.

He was ordained to the priesthood on 29 June 1991.

Pope Benedict XVI named him auxiliary bishop of Paris and titular bishop of Cresima on 21 May 2008. He received his episcopal consecration on 5 September from André Vingt-Trois, Archbishop of Paris.

In 2013 he became head of the doctrinal commission of the Bishops' Conference of France.

On 18 August 2018, Pope Francis named him Archbishop of Reims, and he was installed there on 28 October.

On 14 March 2019, he participated in ceremonies inaugurating the Grand Mosque of Reims. When criticized for welcoming the growth of Islam in France, he wrote: "I would like Catholic men worried about the presence of Islam in our country to be as devoted to Mass or Eucharistic adoration as the men I saw at the mosque on a Thursday evening at the time of the prayer."

He was elected president of the Bishops' Conference of France on 3 April 2019.
