= Thierry Jordan =

French prelate of the Catholic Church

- Archbishop Emeritus of Reims
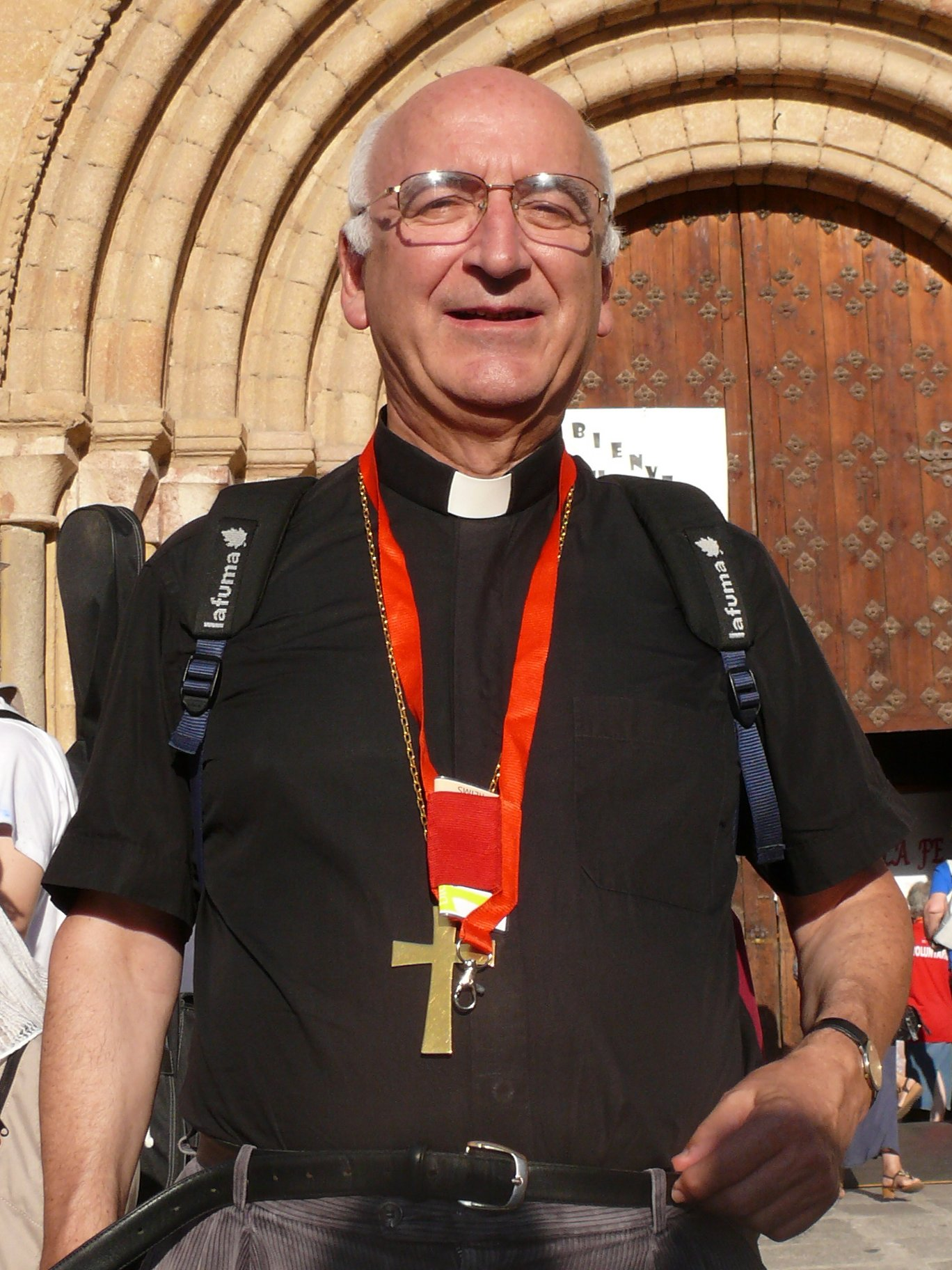
- Church: Catholic Church
- Diocese: Roman Catholic Archdiocese of Reims
- Appointed: 20 July 1999
- Term ended: 18 August 2018
- Predecessor: Gérard Defois
- Successor: Éric de Moulins-Beaufort
- Other post: Bishop of Pontoise (1988–1999)

Orders
- Ordination: 13 December 1987

Personal details
- Born: Thierry Romain Camille Jordan; August 31, 1943 (age 82) Shanghai, China
- Parents: Pierre Jordan; Henriette Roquebert

Thierry Romain Camille Jordan (born 31 August 1943) is a French prelate of the Catholic Church who was Archbishop of Reims from 1999 to 2018. He was previously Bishop of Pontoise for more than a decade.

== Personal life ==
Thierry Jordan was born to financier Pierre Jordan and his wife Henriette (née Roquebert) on 31 August 1943 in Shanghai.

== Career ==
Pope John Paul II appointed him coadjutor bishop to Bishop André Rousset of Pontoise on 6 October 1987 and consecrated a bishop in Saint-Maclou cathedral in Pontoise on 13 December. He succeeded Rousset on 19 November 1988.

He became president of the Episcopal Commission of the Religious States of the Bishops' Conference of France (CEF) in 1993. He was elected to participate in the Synod of Bishops in 1994.

Pope John Paul named him Archbishop of Reims on 20 July 1999 and he was installed there on 26 September.

Within the CEF he was a member of the Secretariat for Relations with Islam from 1987 to 1991, a member of the Episcopal Commission for Consecrated Life from 1987 to 1993, President of that Commission from 1993 to 1996, President of the Canonical Committee from 1990 to 2004 and a member of the Episcopal Commission for ordained ministries.

On 25 August 2014, he participated in the celebrations marking the 250th anniversary of the founding of city of Saint-Louis, Missouri, held at the Sanctuary of St. Philippine-Duchesne of St. Charles.

Pope Francis accepted his resignation as Archbishop of Reims on 18 August 2018, two weeks before his 75th birthday.

== Distinctions ==
Knight of the Legion of Honor Chevalier of the Legion of Honor (decree of 31 December 2006).

== See also ==
- Catholic Church in France
- List of the Roman Catholic dioceses of France
