= Leudigisil =

7th century Bishop of Reims

Leudégisile (fl 641) was the 22nd bishop of Reims from 631 to 641.

He was of a noble family and had as brother of Attila who was bishop of Laon. He was elected Bishop of Reims following Sonnace and in 633 he took part in the installation of St. Aubert of Cambrai, Bishop of Cambrai.

Leudegisilus is known from Flodoard, where he is made a contemporary of King Dagobert, who died in 639.
