= Saint Remigius =

Bishop of Reims (437–533)

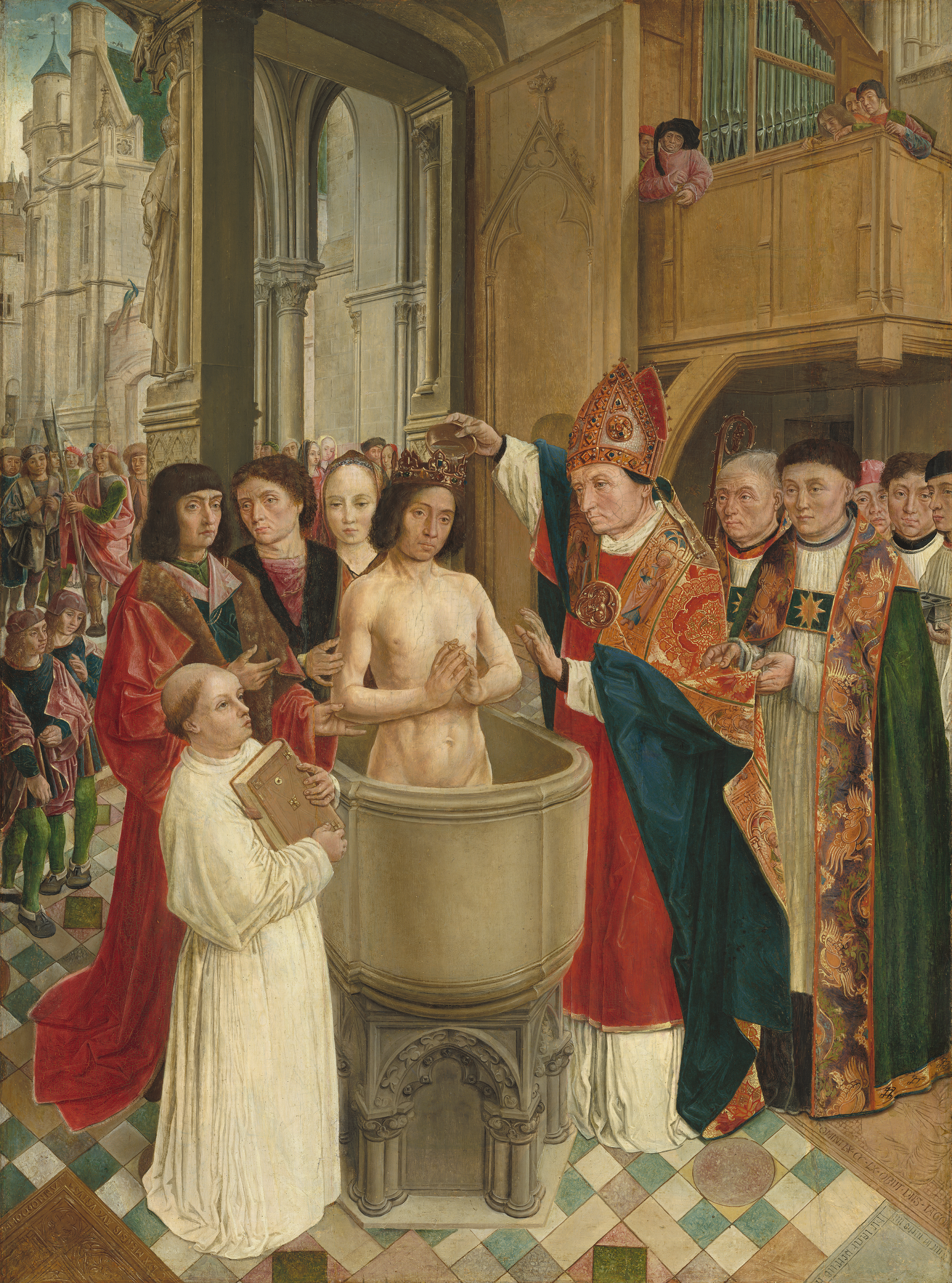
- Saint Remigius baptizes Clovis I, by the Master of Saint Gilles, c. 1500 (National Gallery of Art, Washington, D.C.)

Bishop and Confessor Apostle of the Franks
- Born: c. 437; Cerny-en-Laonnois, Picardy, Roman Empire
- Died: 13 January 533 (aged 95–96); Rheims, Champagne, Kingdom of the Franks
- Venerated in: Catholic Church; Anglican Communion; Eastern Orthodoxy
- Feast: 13 January (Note: Great Synaxaristes: (in Greek) Ὁ Ἅγιος Ρεμίγιος Ἐπίσκοπος Ρημῶν. 13 Ιανουαρίου. ΜΕΓΑΣ ΣΥΝΑΞΑΡΙΣΤΗΣ.); 1 October (translation of relics)
- Attributes: dove, book, lamp
- Patronage: France

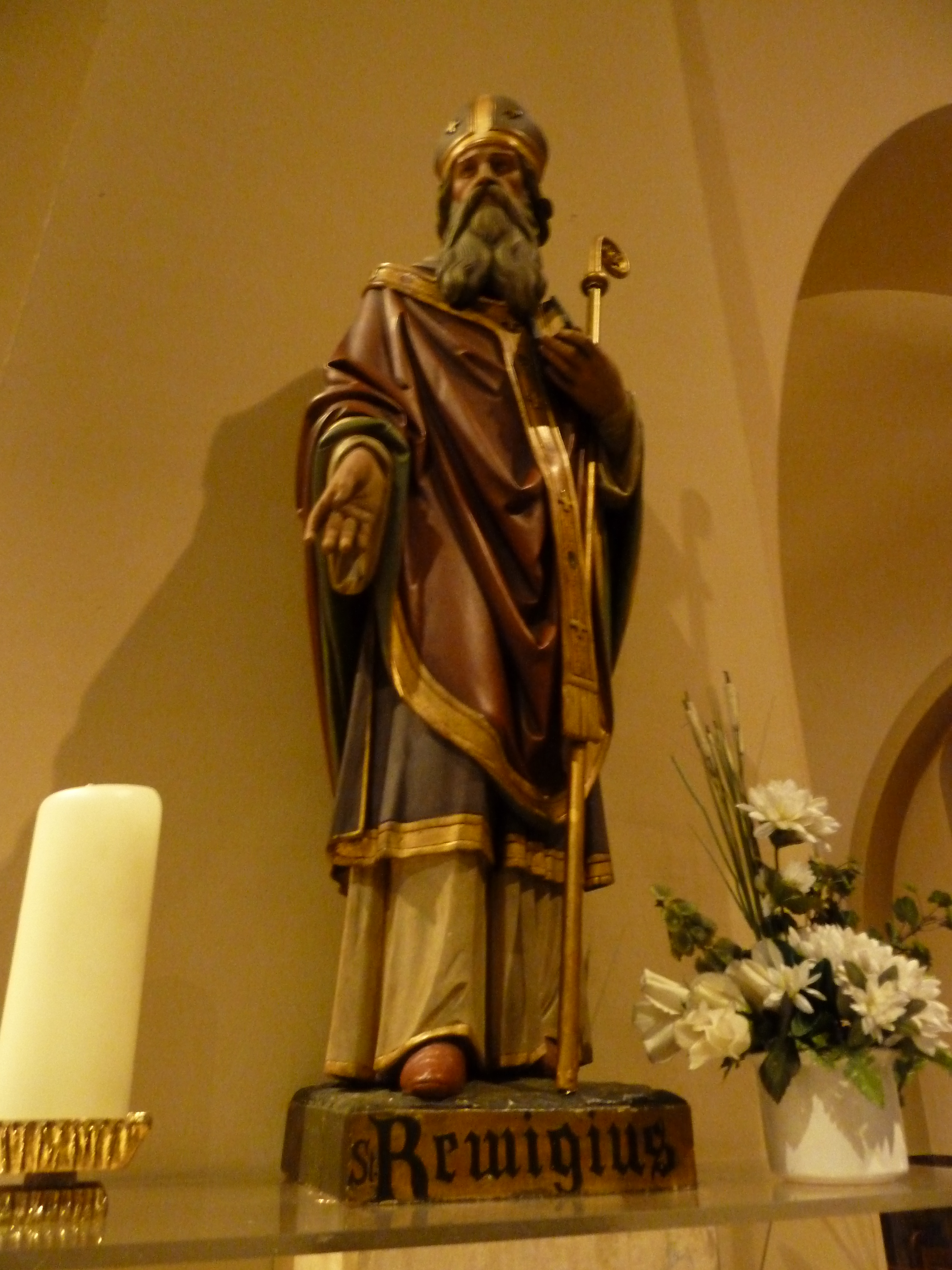
Statue of Saint Remigius at the Saint Remigius Church, Simpelveld, Netherlands

Remigius (French: Remy or Rémi; c. 437 – 13 January 533) was the Bishop of Reims and "Apostle of the Franks". On 25 December 496, he baptised Clovis I, King of the Franks. The baptism, leading to about 3000 additional converts, was an important event in the Christianization of the Franks. Because of Clovis's efforts, a large number of churches were established in the formerly pagan lands of the Frankish empire, establishing a Nicene Christianity for the first time in Germanic lands, most of whom had been converted to Arian Christianity.

== Life ==
Remigius was born, traditionally, at Cerny-en-Laonnois, near Laon, Picardy, into the highest levels of Gallo-Roman society. He is said to have been son of Emilius, count of Laon (who is not otherwise attested) and of Saint Celine, and brother of the Bishop of Soissons, which Clovis conquered in 487. He studied at Reims and soon became so noted for his learning and sanctity, and his high status, that he was elected Bishop of Reims at age 21, though still a layman.

The story of the return of the sacred vessels (most notably the Vase of Soissons), which had been stolen from the church of Soissons, testifies to the friendly relations existing between him and Clovis, King of the Franks, whom he converted to Christianity with the assistance of Vedast (Vedastus, Vaast, Waast) and Clotilde, the Burgundian princess who was wife to Clovis. Even before he embraced Christianity, Clovis had showered benefits upon Remigius and the Christians of Reims, and after his victory over the Alamanni in the battle of Tolbiac at around 497 AD, he requested Remigius to baptize him at Reims (December 25, 496) in the presence of a large company of Franks and Alamanni; according to Gregory of Tours, 3,000 Franks were baptized with Clovis. (Note: The legend of the ampulla of holy oil that was used to anoint the kings crowned at Reims originated after Remigius' time, with Bishop Hincmar of Reims.)

King Clovis granted Remigius stretches of territory, in which Remigius established and endowed many churches. He erected bishoprics at Tournai; Cambrai; Thérouanne, where he personally ordained the first bishop in 499; Arras, where he installed St. Vedast; and Laon, which he gave to his niece's husband Gunband. In 530 he consecrated Medardus, Bishop of Noyon. Remigius' brother Principius was Bishop of Soissons and also corresponded with Sidonius Apollinaris, whose letters give a sense of the highly cultivated courtly literary Gallo-Roman style all three men shared.

The chroniclers of "Gallia Christiana" record that numerous donations were made to Remigius by the Frankish nobles, which he presented to the cathedral at Reims.

Though Remigius never attended any of the church councils, in 517 he held a synod at Reims, at which after a heated discussion he converted a bishop of Arian views. Although Remigius's influence over people and prelates was extraordinary, upon one occasion his condoning of the offences of one Claudius, a priest whom Remigius had consecrated, brought upon him the rebukes of his episcopal brethren, who deemed Claudius deserving of degradation. The reply of Remigius, still extant, is able and convincing.

Few authentic works of Remigius remain: his "Declamations" were elaborately admired by Sidonius Apollinaris, in a finely turned letter to Remigius, but are now lost. Four letters survive in the collection known as the Epistulae Austrasicae: one containing his defence in the matter of Claudius, two written to Clovis, and a fourth to Bishop Falco of Tongres. The "Testament of Saint Remigius" is apocryphal. A brief and strictly legendary "Vita" was formerly ascribed to Venantius Fortunatus. Another, according to Jacobus de Voragine, was written by Ignatius, bishop of Reims. A letter congratulating Pope Hormisdas upon his election (523) is apocryphal, and "the letter in which Pope Hormisdas appears to have appointed him vicar of the kingdom of Clovis is proved to be spurious; it is presumed to have been an attempt of Hincmar to base his pretensions for the elevation of Reims to the primacy, following the alleged precedent of Remigius."

A Commentary on the Pauline Epistles (edited Villalpandus, 1699) is not his work, but that of Remigius of Auxerre.

Remigius' relics were kept in the Cathedral of Reims, whence Hincmar had them translated to Épernay during the Viking invasions and thence, in 1099 to the Abbey of Saint-Rémy.

His tomb in Reims was deliberately desecrated on 7 October 1793 by a Commissioner of the Convention during the French Revolution due to the link between the tomb and royal patronage.

== Christian Recognition ==
Traditionally, his feast day is celebrated on 1 October in the General Roman Calendar of 1960.

Remigius is honored also in the Church of England and in the Episcopal Church on 1 October.

== Legacy ==
List of churches dedicated to Saint Remigius:

- St. Remy's Catholic Church - a Catholic church in Russia, Ohio, United States
- Saint Remigius Church - a Catholic church in Simpelveld, Netherlands
- Long Clawson - an Anglican church in the village of Long Clawson, Leicestershire
- Stoke Holy Cross - an Anglican church in the village of Stoke Holy Cross in South Norfolk
- Seething Norfolk. Church of England round tower church dedicated to St Margaret and St Remigius
- Saint Remigius Church, a Catholic church in Haacht, Belgium
- Saint Remigius Church of England in the village of Hethersett, Norfolk, England.
- Saint Remigius (Church of England), Roydon, South Norfolk, England

== See also ==
- List of Catholic saints
- Saint Abran, hermit of Brittany

Preceded by Bennage	Archbishop of Reims; 459–533	Succeeded by Romanus
