= Archdiocese of Reims =

Archdiocese

Coordinates: 49°15′13″N 4°02′03″E

Archdiocese of Reims Archidiœcesis Remensis Archidiocèse de Reims

Catholic
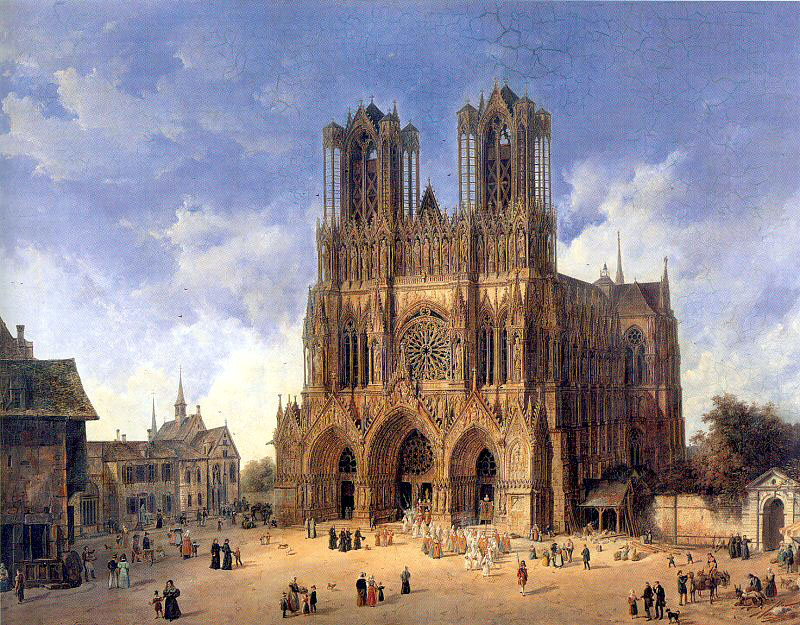
- The Cathedral of Reims, by Domenico Quaglio

- Coat of arms

Location
- Country: France
- Ecclesiastical province: Reims

Statistics
- Area: 6,931 km^{2} (2,676 sq mi)
- Population: Total; Catholics: (as of 2022); 607,606; 563,000 (guess) (92.7%)
- Parishes: 76 'new parishes'

Information
- Denomination: Catholic
- Sui iuris church: Latin Church
- Rite: Roman Rite
- Established: 3rd century (as Diocese of Reims); 4th century (as Archdiocese of Reims)
- Cathedral: Cathedral of Notre Dame of Reims
- Patron saint: Saint Remigius
- Secular priests: 69 (diocesan); 5 (religious orders); 36 permanent deacons

Current leadership
- Pope: Leo XIV
- Metropolitan Archbishop: Éric de Moulins-Beaufort
- Suffragans: Amiens; Beauvais, Noyon, and Senlis; Châlons; Langres; Soissons, Laon, and Saint-Quentin; Troyes
- Auxiliary Bishops: Étienne Emmanuel Vetö
- Bishops emeritus: Thierry Jordan; Joseph Louis Jean Boishu

Map

Website
- catholique-reims.fr

Ecclesiastical province of Reims

The Archdiocese of Reims or Rheims (Latin: Archidiœcesis Remensis; French: Archidiocèse de Reims) is a Latin Church archdiocese of the Catholic Church in France. Established as a diocese around 250 by Bishop Sixtus, it was elevated to an archdiocese around 750. In 1089, the archbishop received the title "primate of Gallia Belgica".

In 1023, Archbishop Ebles acquired the County of Reims, becoming a prince-bishop. Between 1060 and 1170, it was elevated to a duchy and a peerage.

The archdiocese includes the arrondissement of Reims and the département of Ardennes. Its province covers the former région of Champagne-Ardenne. The suffragan dioceses in the ecclesiastical province of Reims are: Amiens, Beauvais, Noyon, and Senlis, Châlons, Langres, Soissons, Laon, and Saint-Quentin, and Troyes.

The archepiscopal see is located at the cathedral of Notre-Dame de Reims, where the kings of France were traditionally crowned. As of 2022, the diocese had one priest for every 7,608 Catholics.

Pope Francis appointed Éric de Moulins-Beaufort as archbishop in 2018.

== History ==
Reims was taken by the Vandals in 406.

According to Flodoard, on Holy Saturday, 497, Clovis was baptized and anointed by Archbishop Remigius of Reims in the cathedral of Reims.

In 719 the city took up arms against Charles Martel, who besieged the city, took it by assault, and devastated it.

In 816, Pope Stephen IV crowned Louis the Pious as Emperor at Reims.

On 28 January 893, Charles III "the Simple' was crowned King of West Francia at Reims.

King Robert I was consecrated and crowned 'Rex Francorum' at Saint-Remi in Reims on 29 June 922 by Archbishop Hervée.

Hugh Capet was crowned at Reims on Christmas Day 988, by Archbishop Adalberon. In 990 the city was attacked by Charles of Lorraine, the rival of Hugues Capet, who seized the city and devastated the area.

In 1801, the archdiocese was suppressed by the Concordat of 1801 and its territory were divided between the diocese of Meaux (department of Marne) and Metz (department of Ardennes).

In 1822, the diocese of Reims was reestablished, with the territory once again restored, including the department of Marne and the department of Ardennes.

=== Councils of Reims ===
The First Council of Reims took place in 625, under the presidency of Archbishop Sonnatius. It produced at least twenty-five canons.

In 1049, from 3 to 5 October, a Council of the Church took place at Reims under the presidency of Pope Leo IX, with twenty bishops and some fifty abbots in attendance. The Pope was in Reims for the dedication of the church of the monastery of Saint-Rémi, in fulfilment of a promise made to Abbot Herimar.

=== Cathedral chapter ===
In 1657, the chapter of the Cathedral of Reims contained nine dignities and sixty-four canons. The dignities included the major archdeacon (Archdeacon of Reims), the minor archdeacon (Archdeacon of Champagne), the provost, the dean, the cantor, the treasurer, the vicedominus, the scholasticus, and the poenitentiarius. There were also a number of collegiate churches in the diocese, whose clergy were led by canons: Saint-Symphorien in Reims (a dean and 20 prebends); Saint-Timothée in Reims (12 prebends); Saint-Côme in Reims (4 prebends); Sainte-Nourrice in Reims (11 prebends); Saint-Pierre aux Dames in Reims (4 prebends); Mézières (a dean, a treasurer and 12 prebends); Braux (12 prebends); Montfaucon (a provost and canons); and Avenay (6 prebends).

The two archdeacons were already in existence in 877, when they are mentioned at the head of the Capitulations issued by Archbishop Hincmar. They were both appointees of the archbishop.

In addition to the right to nominate the archbishop of Reims (since the Concordat of Bologna in 1516), the King enjoyed the right to name the abbot of Haut-Villiers (O.S.B.), Sainte-Baste (O.S.B.), Mouson (O.S.B.), Saint-Nicaise de Reims (O.S.B.), Saint-Pierre-de-Reims (O.S.B.), Saint-Remi de Reims (O.S.B.), Saint-Thierry lez Reims (O.S.B.), Chery (O.Cist.), Elem (O.Cist.), Igny (O.Cist.), Signy (O.Cist.), Vau-le-Roy (O.Cist.), Saint-Denis-de-Reims (O.S.A.), Esparnay-sur-Marne (O.S.A.), Belle-Val (Praemonst.), Chaumont en Porcien (Praemonst.), Sept Fontaines (Praemonst.), and Vau-Dieu (Praemonst.).

== Bishops and archbishops ==
=== Bishops of Reims ===
- St. Sixtus (c. 260)
- St. Sinicius (Sinice) (c. 280)
- St. Amantius (Amanse) (c. 290)
- Imbetausius (before 300–c. 314)
- Aprus (Aper) (328–350)
- Maternianus (350–359)
- Donatianus (361–390)
- Viventius (390–394)
- Severus (394–400)
- Nicasius of Rheims (probably 400–407 but perhaps ?-451)
- Barucius
- Barnabas
- Bennagius (?–459)
- Saint Remigius (Remi) (459–533)
- Romanus (c. 533–535)
- Flavius (c. 535)
- Mappinus (c. 549)
- Egidius (573–590)
- Romulph (590–613)
- Sonnatius (613–c. 627)
- Leudigisil
- Angelbert (c. 630)
- Lando
- Nivard (before 657–673)
- Reolus (673–c. 689)
- Rigobert (c. 689 – after 720)
- Milo (715–744)
- Abel (c. 743/744–748)

=== Archbishops of Reims ===
==== To 1000 ====
- Tilpin (748–795)
- vacant (795–812)
- Wulfaire (812–816)
- Ebbo (816–835)
- vacant (835–840)
- Ebbo (840–841), again
- vacant (841–845)
- Hincmar (845–882)
- Fulk the Venerable (882–900)
- Hervaeus (900–922)
- Seulf (922–925)
- Hugh of Vermandois (925–931)
- Artaud (931–940)
- Hugh of Vermandois (940–946), again
- Artaud (946–961), again
- Odelric (962–969)
- Adalberon (969–988)
- Arnoul (988–991; son of Lothair of France)
- Gerbert of Aurillac (991–996); later Pope Sylvester II
- Arnoul (996–1021), again

==== 1000–1300 ====
- Ebles I of Roucy (1021–1033; count of Roucy, count of Reims, 1023–1033)
- Guy of Châtillon (1033–1055)
- Gervaise of Bellême (1055–1067)
- Manasses I (1069–1080)
- Renaud du Bellay (1083–1096)
- Manasses II (1096–1106)
- Gervaise of Rethel (1106)
- Raoul le Vert (1106–1124)
- Rainaldus de Martigny (1125–1138)
- Samson de Mauvoisin (1140–1161)
- Henry (1162–1175; son of Louis VI of France)
- Guillaume de Blois (Guillaume aux Blanches Mains) (1176–1202)
- Guy Paré (1204 – 30 July 1206)
- Albericus de Humbert (1207 – 24 December 1218)
- Guillaume de Joinville (24 April 1219 – 6 November 1226)
- Henry of Dreux (18 April 1227 – 6 July 1240)
- Juhel de Mathefelon (20 March 1245 – 18 December 1250)
- Thomas de Beaumes (4 March 1251 – 15 February 1263)
- Jean de Courtenay-Champignelles (15 July 1266 – 17 August 1270)
- Pierre Barbet (17 April 1273 – 3 October 1298)
- Robert de Courtenay-Champignelles (10 April 1299 – 3 March 1324)

==== 1300–1500 ====
- Guillaume de Trie (1324–1334)
- Jean de Vienne (1335–1351)
- Hugues d'Arcy (1351–1352)
  - Humbert, O.P. (1352–1355) (Administrator)
- Jean de Craon (1355–1373)
- Louis Thesart (14 April 1374 – 12 October 1375)
- Richard Picque (12 November 1375 – 6 December 1389)
- Ferry Cassinel (29 January 1390 – 26 May 1390) (Avignon Obedience)
- Guy de Roye (1391–1409)
- Simon of Cramaud (2 July 1409 – 1413)
- Pierre Trousseau (2 May 1413 - 16 December 1413)
- Renaud of Chartres (2 January 1414 – 1444)
- Jacques Juvenal des Ursins (9 October 1444 – 3 March 1449)
- Jean Juvenal des Ursins (3 March 1449 – 14 July 1473)
- Pierre de Montfort-Laval (1474–1493)
- Robert Briçonnet (1493–1497)
- Guillaume Briçonnet (1497–1507)

==== 1500–1800 ====
- Cardinal Charles Dominique de Carreto (16 September 1507 – 28 March 1509)
- Cardinal Robert de Lenoncourt (28 March 1509 – 25 September 1532)
- Cardinal Jean de Lorraine (1533–1550)
- Cardinal Charles of Guise (1538–1574)
- Cardinal Louis I of Guise (1574–1588)
- Cardinal Nicolas de Pellevé (1588–1594)
- Philippe du Bec (1594–1605)
- Cardinal Louis II of Guise (1605–1621)
- Gabriel de Sainte-Marie OSB (William Gifford) (1623–1629)
- Henry of Guise (1629–1641)
- Léonore d'Étampes de Valençay (1641–1651)
- Henri de Savoie (1651–1659)
- Cardinal Antonio Barberini (1657/1667 – 4 August 1671)
- Charles Maurice Le Tellier (1668/1671 – 22 February 1710)
- François de Mailly (1 December 1710 – 13 September 1721)
- Armand Jules de Rohan-Guéméné (6 July 1722 – 28 August 1762)
- Charles Antoine de La Roche-Aymon (1763–1777)
- Alexandre-Angélique de Talleyrand-Périgord (1777–1816)

==== From 1800 ====
- vacant
- Jean-Charles de Coucy (1817–1824)
- Jean-Baptist-Marie-Anne-Antoine de Latil (1824–1839)
- Thomas-Marie-Joseph Gousset (1840–1866)
- Jean-Baptiste François Anne Thomas Landriot (1867–1874)
- Benoit-Marie Langénieux (1874–1905)
- Louis Luçon (1906–1930)
- Emmanuel Célestin Suhard (1930–1940)
- Louis-Augustin Marmottin (1940–1960)
- Gabriel Auguste François Marty (1960–1968)
- Émile André Jean-Marie Maury (1968–1972)
- Jacques Eugène Louis Ménager (1973–1988)
- Jean Marie Julien Balland (1988–1995)
- Gérard Defois (1995–1998)
- Thierry Jordan (1999–2018)
- Éric de Moulins-Beaufort (2018–present)

== Auxiliary bishops ==
- Abel de Saint-Brieuc (1483)

== See also ==
- Catholic Church in France
- Council of Reims

== Sources ==
=== Episcopal lists ===
- Gams, Pius Bonifatius (1873). Series episcoporum Ecclesiae catholicae: quotquot innotuerunt a beato Petro apostolo. Ratisbon: Typis et Sumptibus Georgii Josephi Manz. (Use with caution; obsolete)
- Eubel, Conradus, ed. (1913). Hierarchia catholica, Tomus 1 (second ed.). Münster: Libreria Regensbergiana. (in Latin)
- Eubel, Conradus, ed. (1914). Hierarchia catholica, Tomus 2 (second ed.). Münster: Libreria Regensbergiana. (in Latin)
- Gulik, Guilelmus (1923). Eubel, Conradus (ed.). Hierarchia catholica, Tomus 3 (second ed.). Münster: Libreria Regensbergiana.
- Gauchat, Patritius (Patrice) (1935). Hierarchia catholica IV (1592-1667). Münster: Libraria Regensbergiana.
- Longnon, Auguste (1908). Pouillés de la province de Reims. Recueils des historiens de la France: Pouilles (in French and Latin). Vol. Tome VI, 1. partie. Paris: Imprimerie nationale.
- Ritzler, Remigius; Sefrin, Pirminus (1952). Hierarchia catholica medii et recentis aevi V (1667-1730). Patavii: Messagero di S. Antonio.
- Ritzler, Remigius; Sefrin, Pirminus (1958). Hierarchia catholica medii et recentis aevi VI (1730-1799). Patavii: Messagero di S. Antonio.
- Ritzler, Remigius; Sefrin, Pirminus (1968). Hierarchia Catholica medii et recentioris aevi sive summorum pontificum, S. R. E. cardinalium, ecclesiarum antistitum series... A pontificatu Pii PP. VII (1800) usque ad pontificatum Gregorii PP. XVI (1846) (in Latin). Vol. VII. Monasterii: Libr. Regensburgiana.
- Ritzler, Remigius; Pirminus Sefrin (1978). Hierarchia catholica Medii et recentioris aevi... A Pontificatu PII PP. IX (1846) usque ad Pontificatum Leonis PP. XIII (1903) (in Latin). Vol. VIII. Il Messaggero di S. Antonio.
- Pięta, Zenon (2002). Hierarchia catholica medii et recentioris aevi... A pontificatu Pii PP. X (1903) usque ad pontificatum Benedictii PP. XV (1922) (in Latin). Vol. IX. Padua: Messagero di San Antonio. ISBN 978-88-250-1000-8.
- Fasti Ecclesiae Gallicanae: Repertoire prosopographique des évêques, dignitaires et chanoines de France de 1200 a 1500. Vol. 3. Diocèse de Reims. Turnhout: Brepols, 1998.
- Pouillé général, contenant les bénéfices appartenans à la nomination au collaboration du Roy: Archevesche de Reims (in French). Paris: Chez Gervais Alliot. 1648.

=== Studies ===
- Anselme. Histoire Généalogique et Chronologique des Pairs de France. Vol. 2.
- Boussinecq, Georges and Laurent, Gustave. Histoire de Reims des origines jusqu'à nos jours. 1933. ISBN 2-86516-001-7
- Cerf, Charles (1861). Histoire et description de Notre-Dame de Reims (in French). Vol. Tome I: Histoire. Reims: Imp. P. Dubois.
- Cusimano, Richard, ed., and Suger, Abbot of Saint Denis. The Deeds of Louis the Fat. Washington, D.C.: Catholic University of America Press, 1992.
- Histoire de Reims. Pierre Desportes, ed. 1983. ISBN 2-7089-4722-2.
- Duchesne, Louis (1915). Fastes épiscopaux de l'ancienne Gaule, Tome III. Paris: E. de Boccard. pp. 76-88. (in French)
- Fisquet, Honoré (1864). La France pontificale (Gallia Christiana): Metropole de Reims: Reims (in French). Paris: Etienne Repos.
- Jean, Armand (1891). Les évêques et les archevêques de France depuis 1682 jusqu'à 1801 (in French). Paris: A. Picard. p. 78.
- Le Moigne, Frédéric; Christian Sorrel (2016). Les évêques français de la Séparation au pontificat de Jean-Paul II (in French). Paris: Editions du Cerf. ISBN 978-2-204-12086-9.
- Memoire pour le chapitre de l'eglise metropolitaine de Reims, et autres appellans comme d'abus des ordonnances de m. l'Archeveque de Reims, des 5. octobre & 9. decembre 1716. & 20. mars 1717 (in French). Paris: chez Francois Jouenne. 1717. p. 9.
- Sainte-Marthe, Denis de (1751). Gallia christiana, in provincias ecclesiasticas distributa (in Latin). Vol. Tomus nonus (9): de provincia Remensi. Paris: ex Typographia regia. pp. 1–332.
- Société bibliographique (France) (1907). L'épiscopat français depuis le Concordat jusqu'à la Séparation (1802-1905). Paris: Librairie des Saints-Pères.

=== For further reading ===
- Glenn, Jason (2004). Politics and History in the Tenth Century: The Work and World of Richer of Reims. Cambridge University Press. ISBN 978-0-521-83487-2.
