= Stanislas Lalanne =

French Roman Catholic bishop (1948–2026)

- Bishop Emeritus of Pontoise
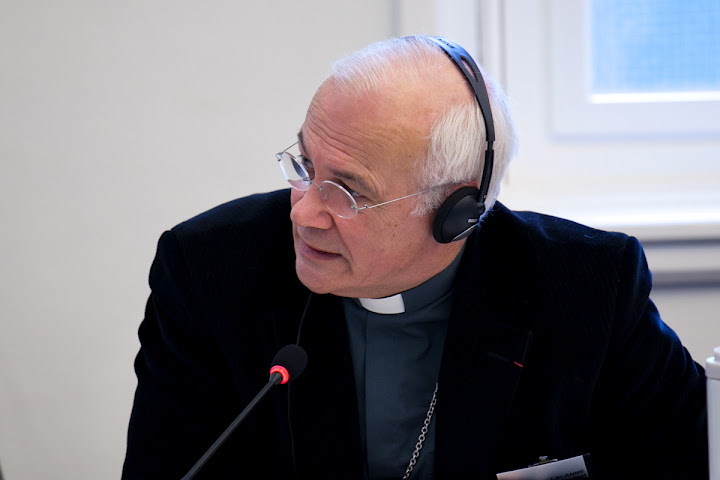
- Lalanne in 2012
- Church: Roman Catholic Church
- Archdiocese: Paris
- See: Pontoise
- Installed: 31 January 2013
- Term ended: 4 June 2024
- Predecessor: Jean-Yves Riocreux
- Successor: Benoît Bertrand
- Previous post: Bishop of Coutances (2007–2013)

Orders
- Ordination: 8 November 1975 by Louis-Paul-Armand Simonneaux
- Consecration: 3 June 2007 by Jean-Pierre Ricard, Éric Aumonier and Hippolyte Simon

Personal details
- Born: 3 August 1948 Metz, France
- Died: 17 August 2026 (aged 78)

Stanislas Marie Georges Jude Lalanne (3 August 1948 – 17 August 2026) was a French Roman Catholic bishop.

From 2007 to 2013 he was Bishop of Coutances. On 31 January 2013 he was appointed Bishop of Pontoise.

Lalanne retired on 4 June 2024. He died on 17 August 2026 at the age of 78.

== See also ==
- Catholic Church in France
- List of the Roman Catholic dioceses of France

== Sources ==
- Catholic Hierarchy: Stanislas Lalanne ^{[self-published]}

Catholic Church titles
Preceded by Jean-Yves Riocreux	Bishop of Pontoise; 2013–2024	Succeeded by Benoît Bertrand
Preceded by Jacques Fihey	Bishop of Coutances; 2007–2013	Succeeded by Laurent Le Boulc'h
