= Louis-François Trouard =

French architect (1729-1804)

Louis-François Trouard (French pronunciation: [lwi fʁɑ̃swa tʁuaʁ]; 1729–1804) was a French architect.

== Biography ==
Trouard was born in Paris to a wealthy father who was a sculptor and supplier of marble to the king.

Trouard studied with Louis-Adam Loriot at the Académie de peinture. Winner of the academy's grand prize (the predecessor to the Prix de Rome) in 1753, he studied at the Académie de France à Rome from 1753 until 1757. During his stay in Italy from 1754 until 1758, he created a travelogue that described innovative trends in architecture, as well as the medieval architecture of Pisa.

Upon his return to Paris, he constructed a house for his father at 9 rue du Faubourg-Montmartre. The construction employed a Greek frieze evoking the style of one of his classmates in Rome, Pierre-Louis Moreau-Desproux. He built another house for his father in 1761 at 1 rue du Faubourg-Poissonnière (the house has since been destroyed).

Under the protection of Monseigneur de Jarente, he was made the architect of the royal commissaries who were responsible for the construction of religious buildings with funds seized from fleeing Protestants. In 1764 he added the Chapel de la Providence (now the Chapelle des Catéchismes) to the church of Saint-Louis at Versailles (now Versailles Cathedral).

He then commenced construction of the church of Saint-Symphorien, the third parish of Versailles, which he built as a basilica.

In 1765, he succeeded Ange-Jacques Gabriel as the architect of Orléans Cathedral.

He was a close friend of Guillaume Thomas François Raynal.

Trouard joined the Royal Academy of Architecture in 1769. His students Claude Nicolas Ledoux, Pierre-Adrien Pâris and his own son, Louis Alexandre Trouard, received the grand prize in 1780.

In 1773, Trouard was forced to leave Versailles and return to Paris for his reputed involvement in an embezzlement scandal. King Louis XVI later cleared him of the accusations.

== Major works ==
- Maison Trouard - constructed in 1758, for his father in the fishmongers' quarter, at 9 rue du Faubourg-Poissonnière, 9th district.
- Chapelle de la Providence – Versailles Cathedral (1764)
- Completion (tower and eastern façade) of Orleans Cathedral (1765–1773)
- Church of Saint-Symphorien, Versailles (1764–1771).
- Salon des Aigles at the Hôtel d'Aumont, 10 place de la Concorde, Paris (now the Hôtel de Crillon)
- Chapel at Meung-sur-Loire

== Descendants ==
- Louis Trouard is the 6 times great-grandfather of actor Jim Parsons of the television show The Big Bang Theory, as discovered on Who Do You Think You Are.

Achille Louis-Maire TROUARD, born ca 1762, Paris, and Louis Alexandre TROUARD born ca 1760 Paris, died .17 July 1802, Port au Prince. Two sons of Louis François TROUARD and Marie-Genevieve RONDEL. Primary source; Archdiocese of New Orleans Sacramental Records, Marriage Book 2, page 68, N° 284.
