= Albert Malbois =

French Roman Catholic bishop

His Excellency Albert-Georges-Yves Malbois
- Bishop Emeritus of Evry-Corbeil-Essonnes
- Church: Roman Catholic Church
- Diocese: Corbeil-Essonnes-Évry
- In office: 1966–1977
- Predecessor: none
- Successor: Guy Alexis Herbulot
- Previous post: Auxiliary Bishop of Versailles (1961–1966)

Orders
- Ordination: 29 June 1938
- Consecration: 22 April 1961 by Alexandre Renard

Personal details
- Born: 17 November 1915 Versailles, France
- Died: 12 February 2017 (aged 101)
- Coat of arms: Albert-Georges-Yves Malbois's coat of arms

Albert-Georges-Yves Malbois (17 November 1915 – 12 February 2017) was a French prelate of the Roman Catholic Church.

== Biography ==
Malbois was born in Versailles, France, and was ordained to the priesthood on 29 June 1938 in the Diocese of Versailles. He became a vicar in Saint-Cloud in 1939. He was appointed Titular Bishop of Altava and Auxiliary Bishop on 9 March 1961, and received his episcopal consecration on 22 April 1961. On 9 October 1966 he was appointed bishop of Corbeil-Essonnes-Évry, a position he held until his resignation in September 1977. He turned 100 in November 2015. Malbois died on 12 February 2017 at the age of 101.
