= Saint-Régis-du-Coin =

- Commune
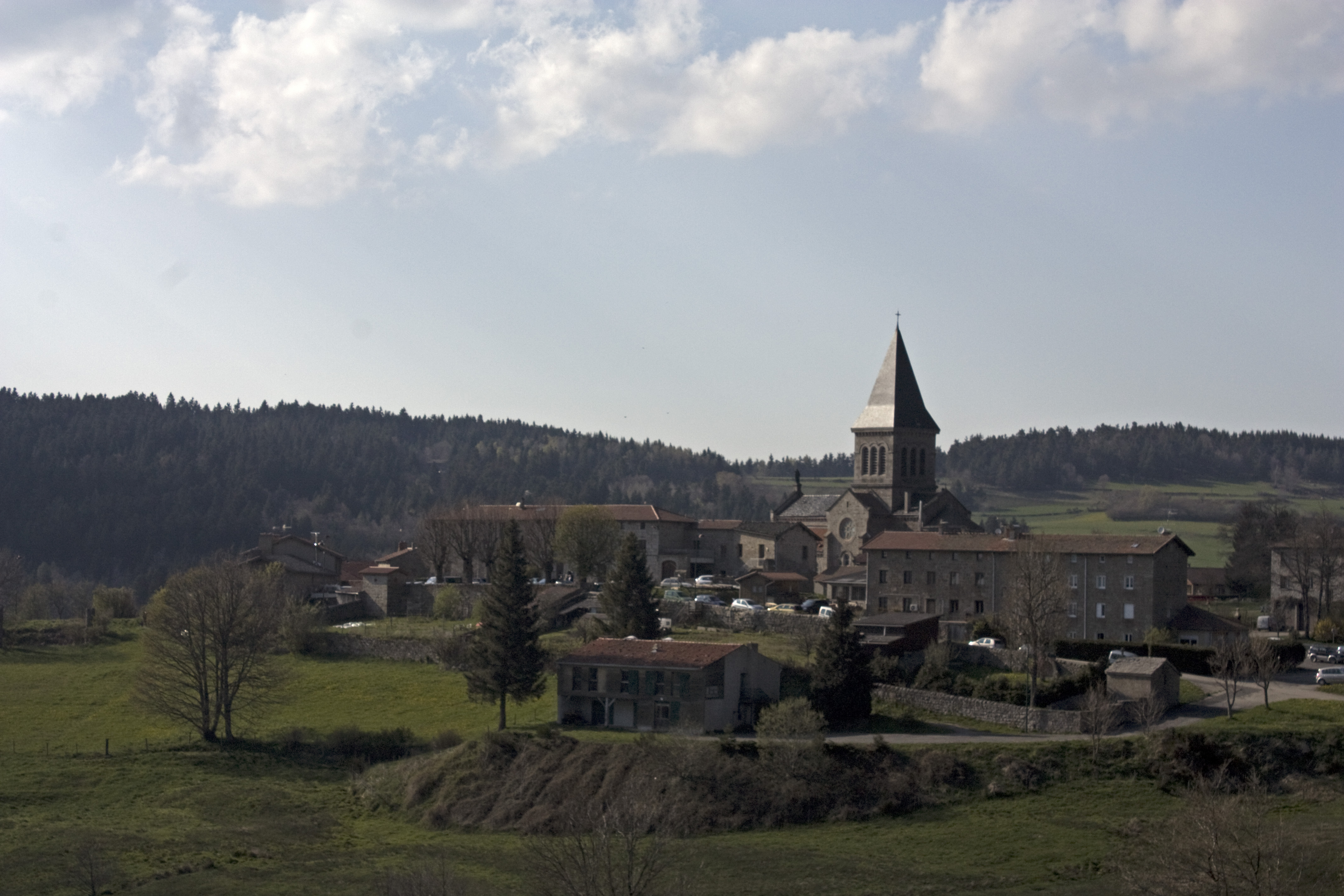
- Location of Saint-Régis-du-Coin
- Location within France Location within Auvergne-Rhône-Alpes
- Coordinates: 45°17′04″N 4°26′42″E
- Country: France
- Region: Auvergne-Rhône-Alpes
- Department: Loire
- Arrondissement: Saint-Étienne
- Canton: Le Pilat
- Intercommunality: Monts du Pilat

Government
  - Mayor (2020–2026): André Vermeersch
- Area^{1}: 20.4 km^{2} (7.9 sq mi)
- Elevation: 1,070 m (3,510 ft)
- Highest elevation: 1,302 m (4,272 ft)
- Lowest elevation: 977 m (3,205 ft)
- Population (2023): 408
  - Density: 20.0/km^{2} (51.8/sq mi)
- Time zone: UTC+01:00 (CET)
  - Summer (DST): UTC+02:00 (CEST)
- INSEE/Postal code: 42280 /42660
- ^{1} French Land Register data, which excludes lakes, ponds, glaciers > 1 km^{2} (0.386 sq mi or 247 acres) and river estuaries.

Saint-Régis-du-Coin (French pronunciation: [sɛ̃ ʁeʒis dy kwɛ̃]) is a commune in the Loire department in central France.

== Geography ==
This town of the Loire, which is part of the Pilat Regional Nature Park is located 21 km from Saint-Etienne. His village is situated 1071 m above sea level, so it's a mid-mountain terrain that characterizes the town.

== Climate ==
Because of its location in the uplands, the climate of the St. Regis-du-Coin is harsh in winter (cold and snow) but mild in summer.

== History ==
The town is recent, it dates only from 1858. Its territory was created from plots taken at the town of Marlhes and Saint-Sauveur-en-Rue. Its name comes from a locality called "The Corner" located on this time, near the present town. It added "St. Regis" to forgive, as is the oral tradition, poor reception given to someone who would become St. John Francis Regis, making it the only town in France to carry the name of this apostle of Velay and Vivarais.

== Population ==
Historical population
Year	Pop.	±% p.a.
1968	333	—
1975	265	−3.21%
1982	292	+1.40%
1990	283	−0.39%
1999	337	+1.96%
2007	372	+1.24%
2012	378	+0.32%
2017	387	+0.47%
2023	408	+0.88%
Source: INSEE

== Sights ==
- The bogs of Gimel.

Bogs of Gimel are a protected site, because they are the largest wetland of the Natural Park of Pilat. Rectangular pits are the mark of a former exploitation, as the hydraulic network witness of the necessary drainage.

- Mount Chaussitre

== Galleries ==
Bogs

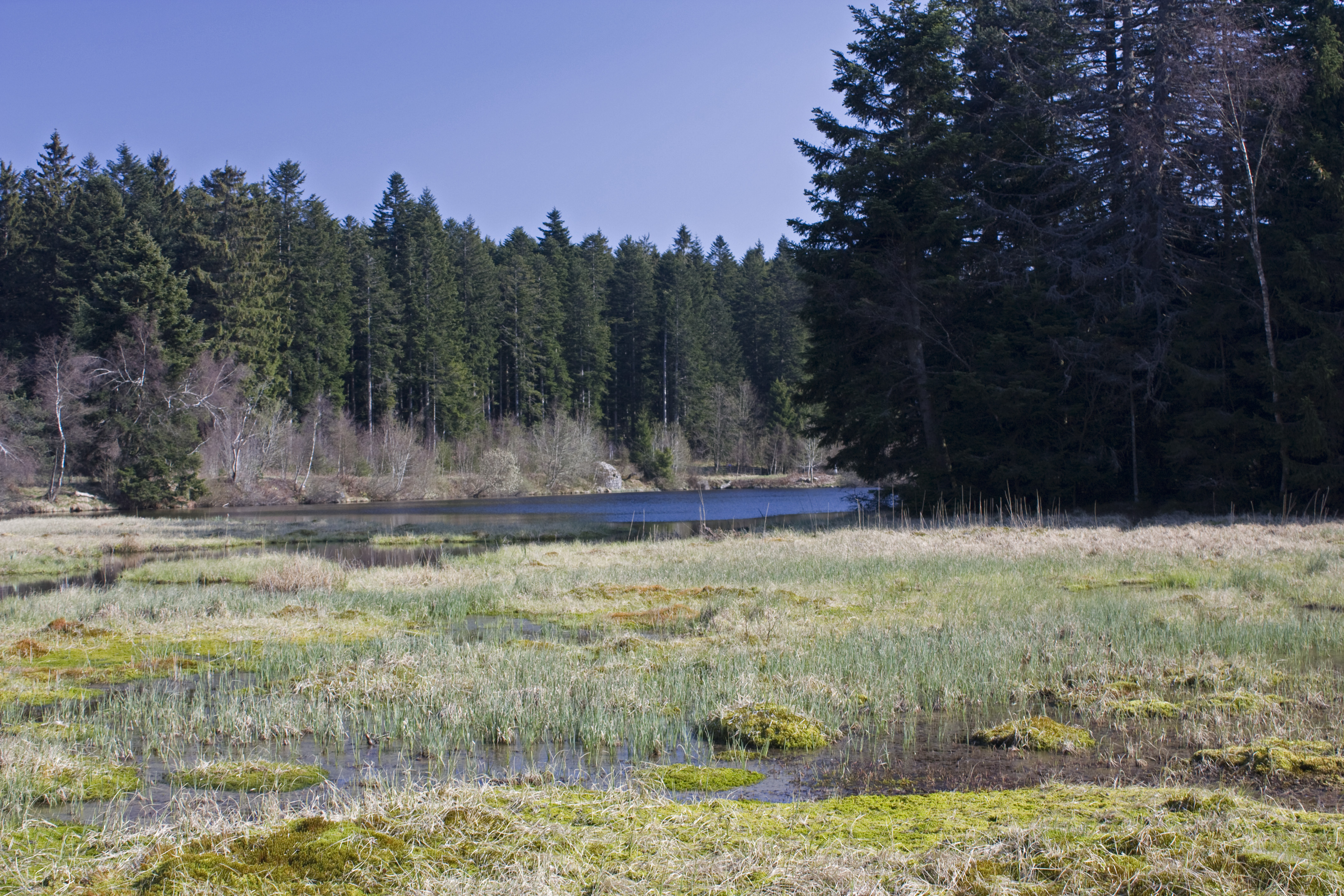
Floating bog, South view.

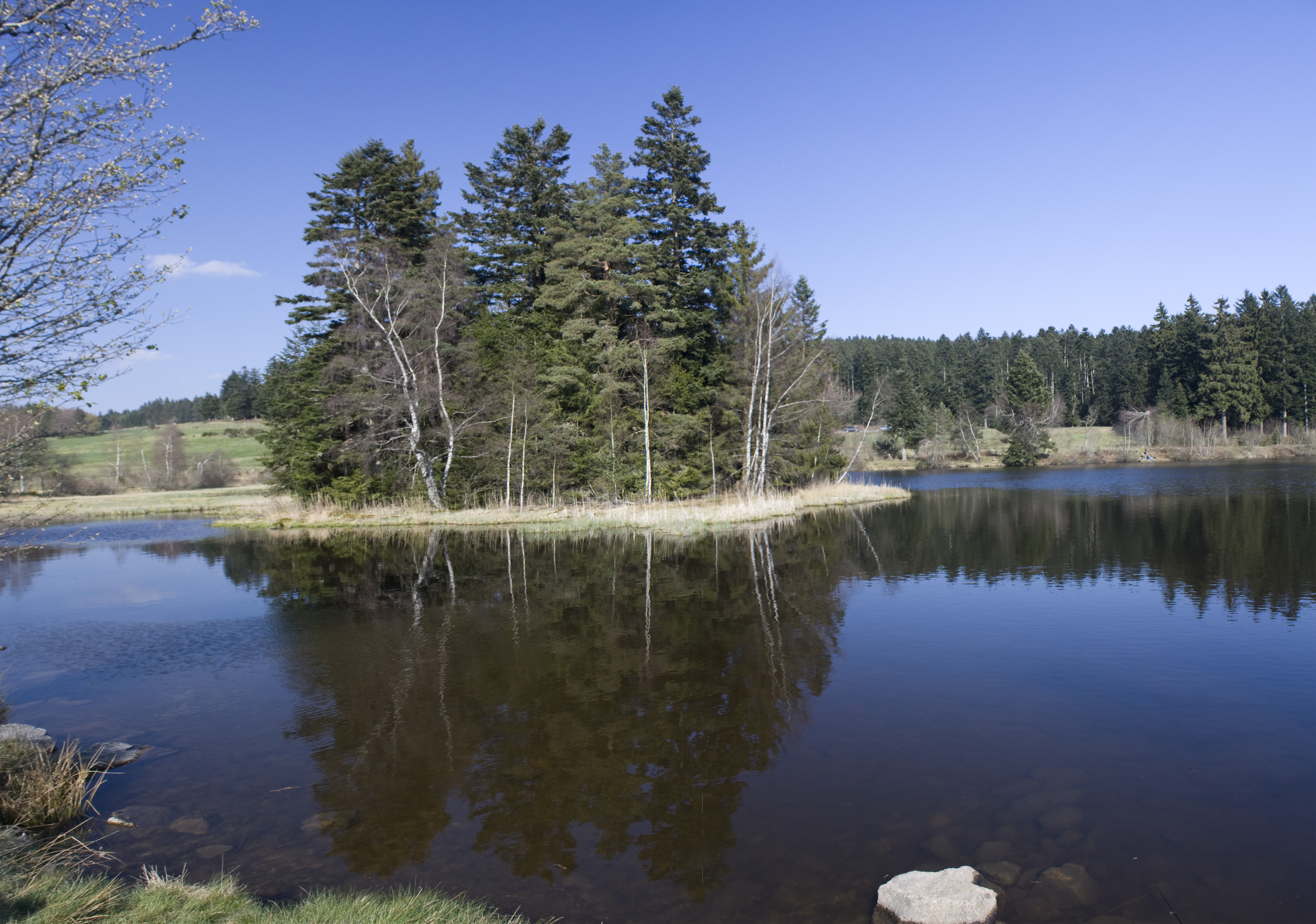
Floating bog, East view.

== See also ==
- Communes of the Loire department
