= Ernest Cabo =

Guadeloupean Roman Catholic bishop (1932–2019)

Ernest Mesmin Lucien Cabo
- Bishop of Basse-Terre
- Church: Catholic Church
- Diocese: Diocese of Basse-Terre
- In office: 2 July 1984 – 15 May 2008
- Predecessor: Siméon Oualli
- Successor: Jean-Yves Riocreux
- Previous posts: Titular Bishop of Bocconia (1983-1984); Auxiliary Bishop of Basse-Terre (1983-1984)

Orders
- Ordination: 4 October 1964
- Consecration: 6 November 1983 by Paul Fouad Tabet

Personal details
- Born: 15 December 1932 Sainte-Rose, Colony of Guadeloupe, French Empire
- Died: 28 November 2019 (aged 86) Basse-Terre, Guadeloupe, France

Ernest Mesmin Lucien Cabo (15 December 1932 in Sainte-Rose, Guadeloupe – 28 November 2019 in Basse-Terre) was the Roman Catholic bishop of the Diocese of Basse-Terre in Guadeloupe from 1984 to 2008.

Cabo was ordained a priest in 1964 and on 2 July 1984 succeeded Siméon Oualli as the bishop of Basse-Terre. He retired on 15 May 2008 and was succeeded by the bishop of Pontoise, Jean-Yves Riocreux, who was appointed bishop of Basse-Terre in June 2012 and took up the post in September 2012.
