= Éric Aumonier =

Éric Aumonier may refer to:

- Eric Aumonier (1899–1974), British sculptor
- Éric Aumonier (bishop) (born 1946), French bishop
