= Church of Notre-Dame, Versailles =

- Église Notre-Dame de Versailles (French)
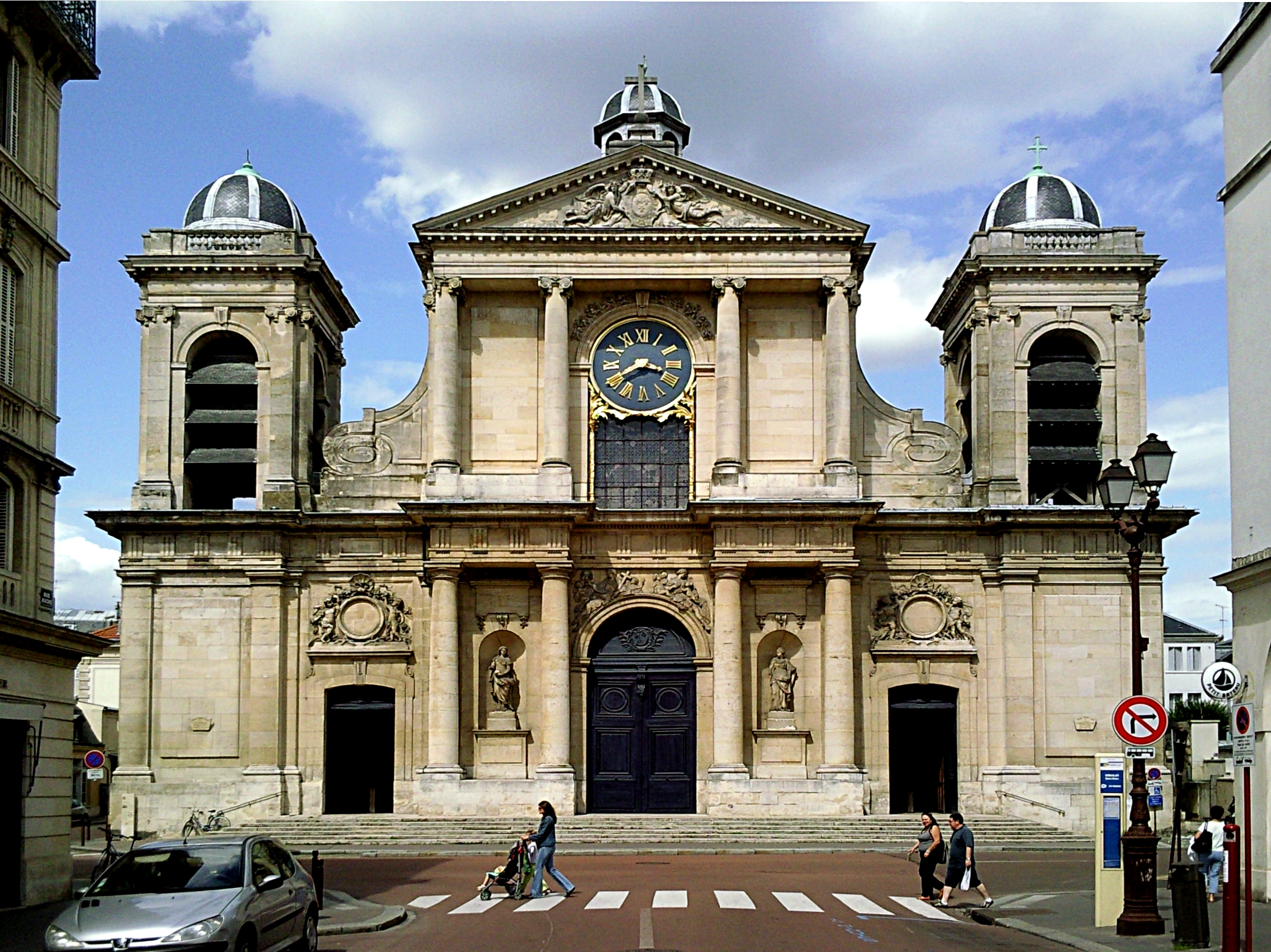
- Church of Notre-Dame, Versailles
- Church of Notre-Dame, Versailles
- Location: Versailles, France
- Denomination: Catholic
- Tradition: Roman Rite

Architecture
- Architect: Jules Hardouin-Mansart
- Style: Neoclassical
- Groundbreaking: 17th century
- Completed: 19th century

Administration
- Diocese: Versailles

The Church of Notre-Dame, Versailles (French: Église Notre-Dame de Versailles), is a Roman Catholic parish church in Versailles, Yvelines, France, in the Rue de la Paroisse.

== History ==
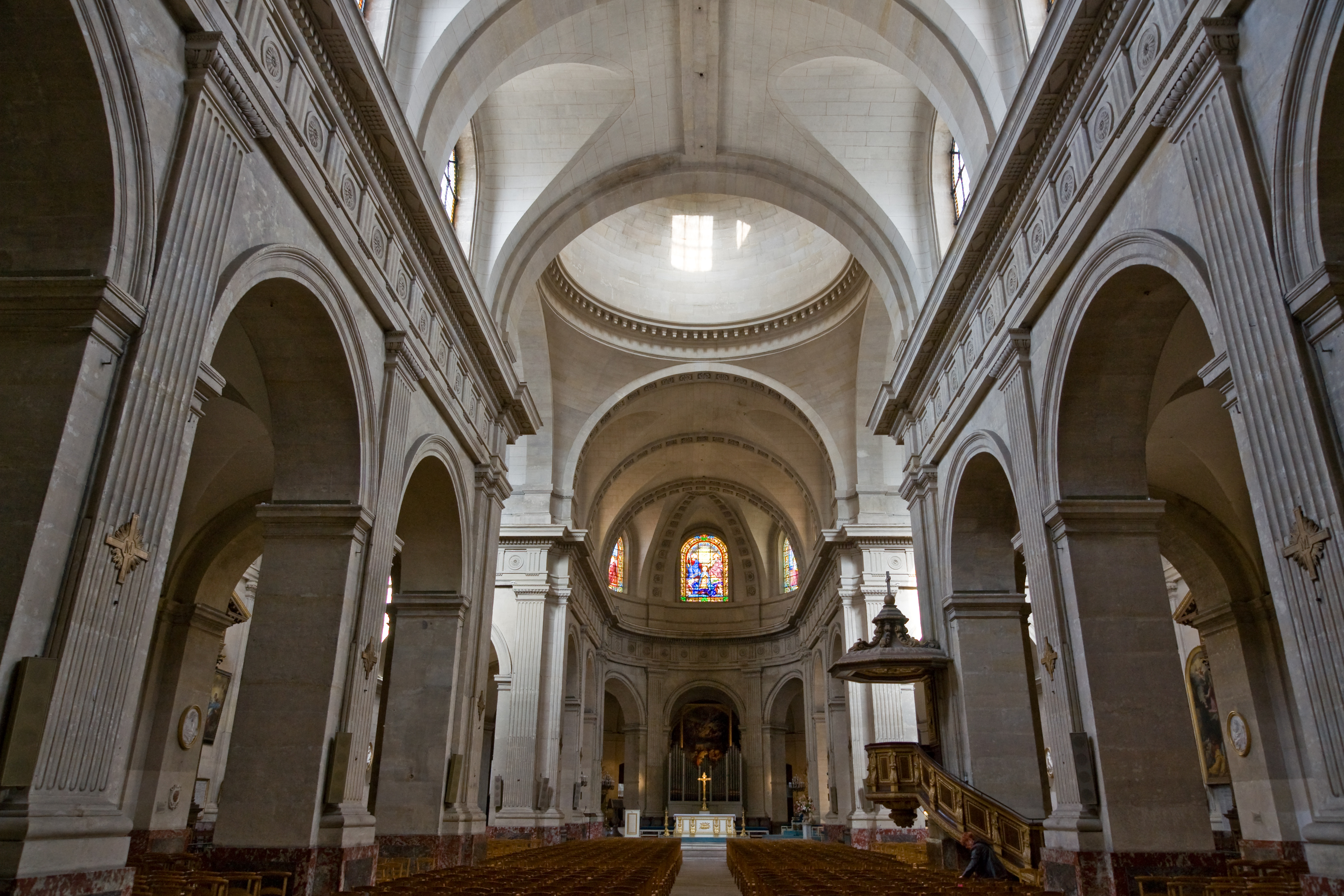
Interior

The church was built at the command of Louis XIV by Jules Hardouin-Mansart in the French Baroque architectural style (also known as French Classicism) and was consecrated on 30 October 1686. The parish of Notre-Dame included the Palace of Versailles and thus registered the baptisms, marriages and burials of the French royal family.

In 1791 it was declared a cathedral but converted to a Temple of Reason in 1793. After the Revolution the bishop of Versailles chose instead as his seat the Church of Saint-Louis (the present Versailles Cathedral).

Between 1858 and 1873, a new chapel was added by the architect Le Poittevin, who also built the market-halls of the Marché Notre-Dame.

The church contains sculptures by Pierre Mazzeline and Noël Jouvenet.

The church has been classed as a monument historique since 4 August 2005.

== Cemetery ==
The Cemetery of Notre-Dame (French: Cimetière Notre-Dame) was established by the church and parish of Notre-Dame in 1777 and covers three hectares. Besides quantities of burials of aristocrats, members of religious orders and people of artistic or historic interest, there is also an enclosed section for soldiers of the Prussian army who fell during the Franco-Prussian War of 1870.

== Sources and external links ==
- Church of Notre-Dame, Versailles: official website (in French)
