= Siméon Oualli =

Guadeloupean clergyman and bishop

- Bishop of Basse-Terre
- Church: Catholic Church
- Diocese: Diocese of Basse-Terre
- In office: 29 June 1970 – 2 July 1984
- Predecessor: Jean Gay
- Successor: Ernest Cabo

Orders
- Ordination: 25 February 1957
- Consecration: 7 October 1970 by Henri Varin de la Brunelière

Personal details
- Born: 18 February 1928 Saint-François, Colony of Guadeloupe, French Empire
- Died: 17 March 2002 (aged 74)

Siméon Oualli (born 18 February 1928 – 17 March 2002) was a Guadeloupean clergyman and bishop for the Roman Catholic Diocese of Basse-Terre. Oualli was born in Saint-François, Guadeloupe. He became ordained in 1957. He was appointed bishop in 1970. He died on 17 March 2002, at the age of 74.
