= Pontoise Cathedral =

Cathedral in Pontoise, France

Coordinates: 49°3′2″N 2°5′50″E

Pontoise Cathedral Cathédrale Saint-Maclou de Pontoise
- Pontoise Cathedral

Religion
- Affiliation: Roman Catholic Church
- Province: Diocese of Pontoise
- Region: Val-d'Oise
- Rite: Roman
- Ecclesiastical or organisational status: Cathedral
- Status: Active

Location
- Location: Pontoise, France
- Interactive map of Pontoise Cathedral; Cathédrale Saint-Maclou de Pontoise

Architecture
- Type: church
- Style: Late Gothic (Flamboyant), Renaissance
- Groundbreaking: 12th century
- Completed: 18th century

Pontoise Cathedral (French: Cathédrale Saint-Maclou de Pontoise) is a Roman Catholic church located in the town of Pontoise, on the outskirts of Val d'Oise in Paris, France. The cathedral, dedicated to Saint Malo (Saint Maclou), has been the episcopal seat of the Diocese of Pontoise since its creation in 1966. It was formerly a parish church.

Construction began in the 12th century on the site of an ancient chapel of Saint Eustace and the building was enlarged and completed in the 15th and 16th centuries. Thus the central and eastern parts of the cathedral are 12th century, while the tower and the central portal are in the Flamboyant style. There are Renaissance additions flanking the central structure, and a north portal of the same period.

The cathedral has been a monument historique since 1840.

== History ==
Pontoise Cathedral was not built as a cathedral, but as a parish church in the northern part of the town of Pontoise, around the middle of the 12th century. The first parish priest was named Robert and was alive in 1165.

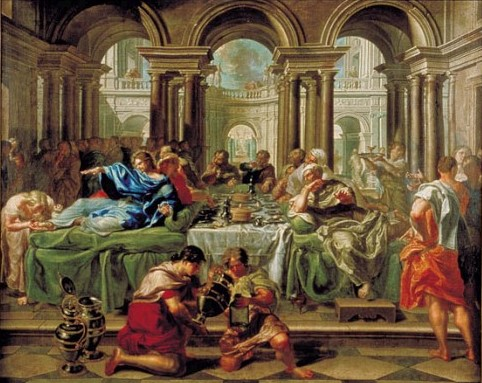
The Seven Sacraments, Penitence by Abraham Godijn c. 1724

There is no record of a parish of Saint-Maclou until 1213, and it was possessed of a double cure until 1736, a peculiarity that could be explained by an older chapel of Saint-Eustache having coexisted for a time with the church of Saint-Maclou, or else by the division of a seigneurial inheritance comprising altar revenues. The second possibility is more plausible because the chapel was founded in 1110 and was only served by vicars of the parish of Saint-Mellon, and was perhaps only a side chapel of an earlier church of Saint-Maclou known since 1090.

The creation of the Val-d'Oise department led to the establishment of the diocese of Pontoise on 9 October 1966 and the consequent elevation of the main church of the episcopal city to the rank of cathedral.

Apart from the small group of cathedrals built as such in the territory of the present Île-de-France region, the church of Saint-Maclou can be considered as one of the area's most important buildings, both for its dimensions and for its architectural value, along with the Collegiate Church of Notre-Dame of Mantes-la-Jolie, the Collegiate Church of Notre-Dame-du-Fort of Étampes and the Collegiate Church of Saint-Martin of Étampes. The first study of it appeared in 1587, and it is one of the first five buildings on the territory of the present department of Val-d'Oise to be listed as a historical monument, in 1840.

No historical documents exist to attest the exact construction period of the church of Saint-Maclou. It had a cruciform plan consisting of a nave of five bays accompanied by two single aisles; a transept, each wing of which consisted of two bays; a central bell-tower above the crossing; and a choir of a single bay with a semicircular apse, surrounded by an ambulatory with five radiating chapels. Significant elements of this early church still exist, although their initial character has been lost as a result of reconstruction.

The original church retained its appearance for about a century and a half until on 30 October 1309 a hurricane caused the collapse of the central belltower, which then partially destroyed the nave with the collapse of the last pillar on the south side. The repair of the nave was undertaken by the butchers of the city and finished in 1325. From the middle of the next century the church was enlarged by the addition of two additional bays to the nave and aisles to the west, along with the elevation of a new western façade and the construction of a new bell tower to its left. Work continued with the restoration of the vaults and windows of the choir and the ambulatory, and ended initially in 1477 with the construction of a sacristy on two levels on the site of the first radiant chapel south of the choir.

== See also ==
- List of Gothic Cathedrals in Europe
- List of tourist attractions in Paris

== Sources ==
- Catholic Hierarchy: Diocese of Pontoise
- Pontoise Cathedral at The Planet's Cathedrals
- Pontoise Cathedral at Structurae
