= Jean-Yves Riocreux =

- Bishop of Basse-Terre
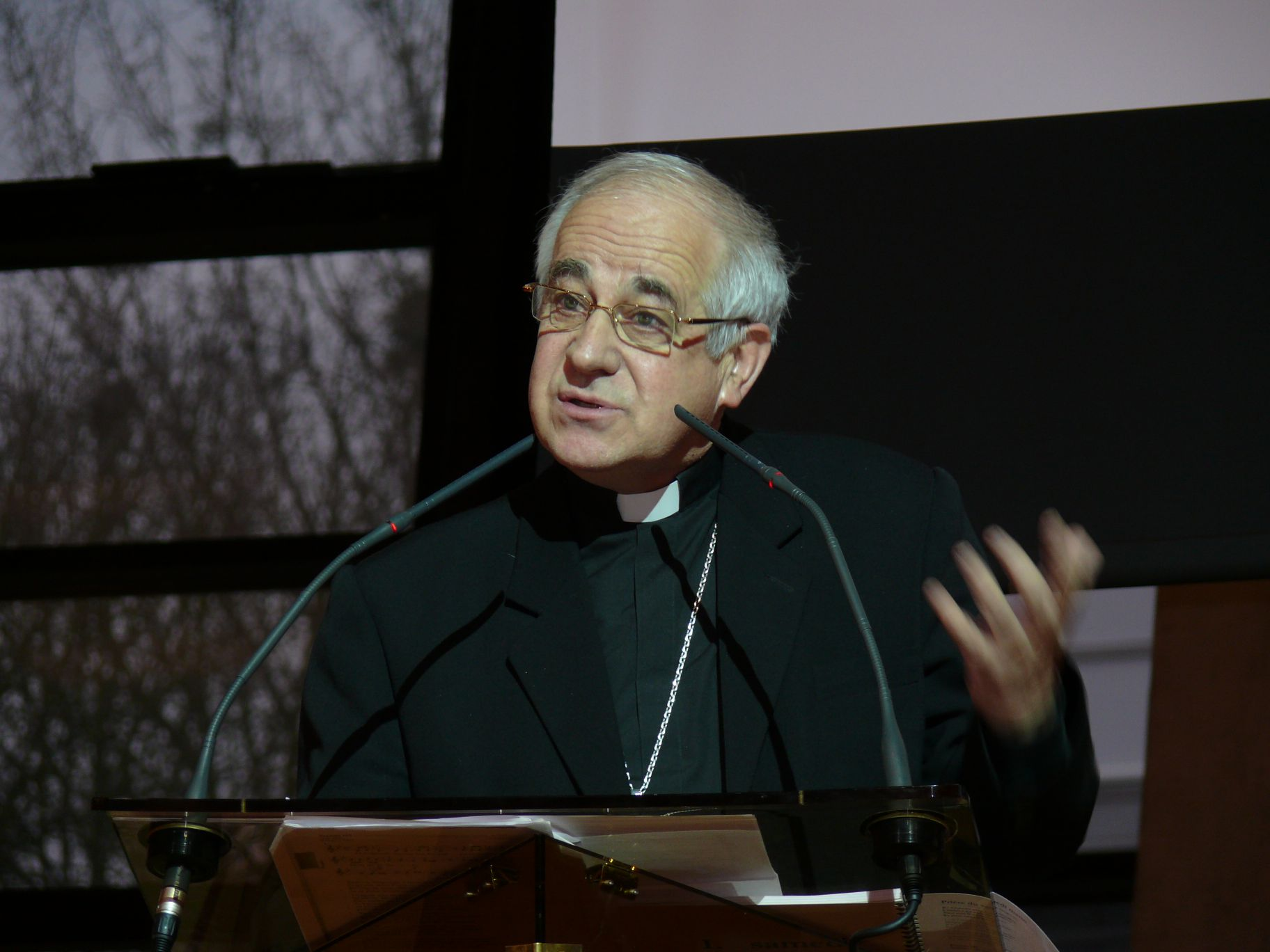
- Church: Roman Catholic Church
- See: Bishop of Basse-Terre
- In office: 15 June 2012
- Predecessor: Ernest Cabo

Orders
- Ordination: 22 June 1974
- Consecration: 29 June 2003 by Jean-Marie Lustiger

Personal details
- Born: 24 February 1946 (age 80) Marlhes, France
- Coat of arms

Monsignor Jean-Yves Riocreux (born 24 February 1946 at Marlhes) is the French Roman Catholic Bishop of Basse-Terre.

Mgr. Riocreux was appointed Bishop of Pontoise on 5 May 2003 and consecrated on 29 June 2003. He was appointed Bishop of Basse-Terre on 15 June 2012, leaving Pontoise on 16 September, and was installed on 30 September 2012.

== See also ==
- Catholic Church in France
- List of the Roman Catholic dioceses of France

== Sources ==
- Catholic Hierarchy: Jean-Yves Riocreux

Catholic Church titles
Preceded by Ernest Cabo	Bishop of Basse-Terre; 2012–present	Succeeded by Incumbent
