= Diocese of Versailles =

Catholic diocese in France

Coordinates: 48.7985°N 2.12487°E

Diocese of Versailles Dioecesis Versaliensis Diocèse de Versailles

Catholic
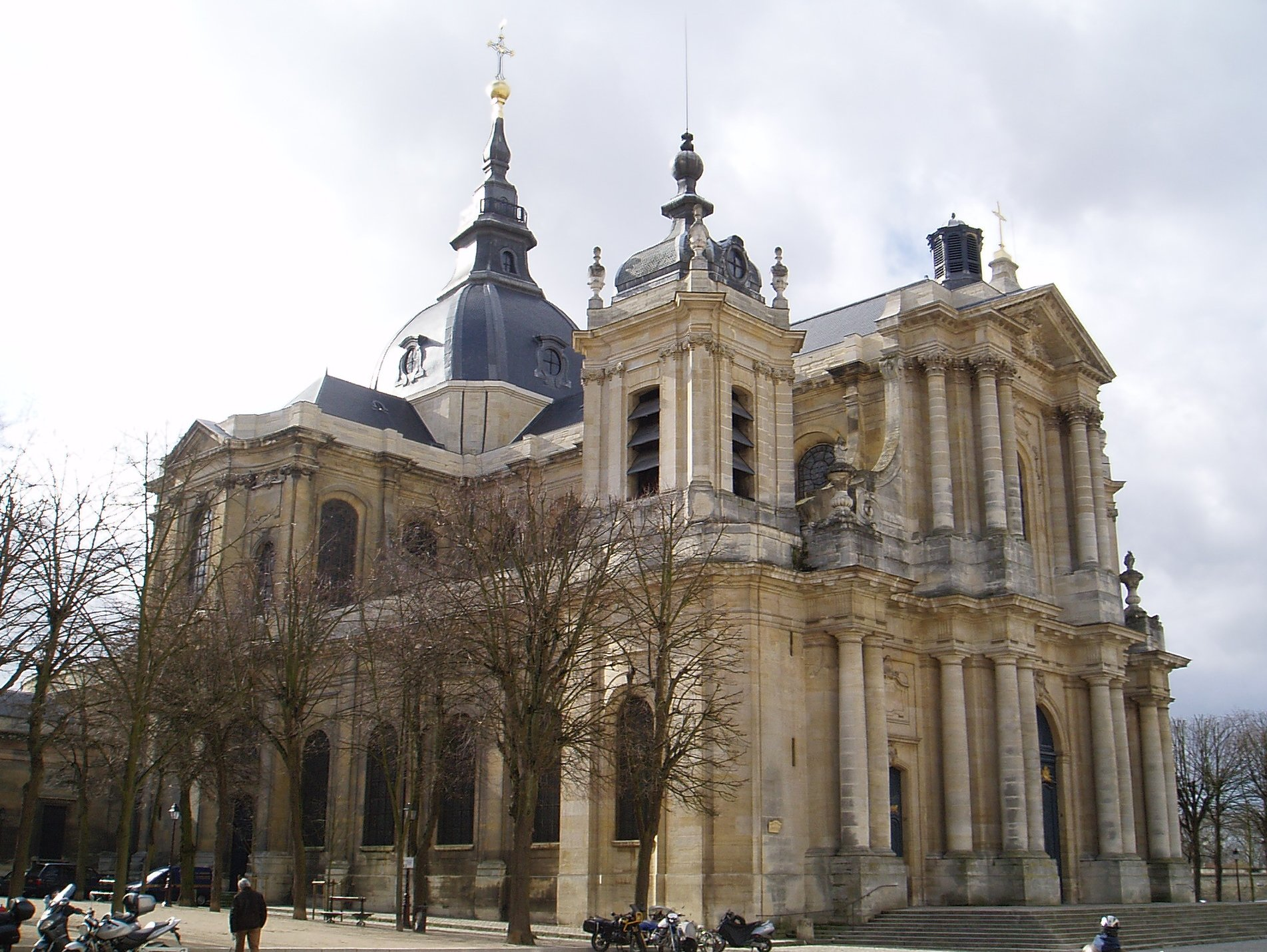
- Versailles Cathedral

Location
- Country: France
- Ecclesiastical province: Paris
- Metropolitan: Archdiocese of Paris

Statistics
- Area: 2,270 km^{2} (880 sq mi)
- Population: Total; Catholics: (as of 2022); 1,441,398; 929,000 (64.5%)
- Parishes: 65

Information
- Denomination: Roman Catholic
- Sui iuris church: Latin Church
- Rite: Roman Rite
- Established: 29 November 1801
- Cathedral: Cathedral of St. Louis in Versailles
- Patron saint: St. Louis IX of France
- Secular priests: 176 (Diocesan); 28 (Religious Orders); 67 Permanent Deacons

Current leadership
- Pope: Leo XIV
- Bishop: Luc Crépy
- Metropolitan Archbishop: Laurent Ulrich
- Bishops emeritus: Éric Aumonier

Map

Website
- Website of the Diocese

The Diocese of Versailles (Latin: Dioecesis Versaliensis; French: Diocèse de Versailles) is a Latin diocese of the Catholic Church, in France. The diocese, headed by the Bishop of Versailles, was established in 1801. Until then, its territory had mostly been part of the Archdiocese of Paris and the Diocese of Chartres. It was centred on Versailles.

== History ==
On its creation in 1791 by the Constituent Assembly, the territory of the diocese of Versailles corresponded to the département of Seine-et-Oise.

Following the boundary changes of the départements of Île-de-France in 1964, new dioceses were established on 9 October 1966. The diocese of Versailles was therefore modified to correspond to the département of Yvelines, following the creation of the Dioceses of Évry–Corbeil-Essones, Nanterre, Saint-Denis, Créteil, Pontoise.

== Bishops of Versailles ==
1. Louis Charrier de La Roche (1802–1827)
2. Jean-François-Étienne Borderies (1827–1832)
3. Louis-Marie-Edmond Blanquart de Bailleul (1832–1844)
4. Jean-Nicaise Gros (1844–1857)
5. Jean-Pierre Mabille (1858–1877)
6. Pierre-Antoine-Paul Goux (1877–1904)
7. Charles-Henri-Célestin Gibier (1906–1931)
8. Benjamin-Octave Roland-Gosselin (1931–1952)
9. Alexandre-Charles-Albert-Joseph Renard (1953–1967)
10. Louis-Paul-Armand Simonneaux (1967–1988)
11. Jean-Charles Thomas (1988–2001)
12. Éric Aumonier (2001–2020)
13. Lucien Crepy (2021–present)

== The native bishops of Versailles ==
- Thierry Jordan, archbishop of Reims
- Stanislas Lalanne, bishop of Coutances et Avranches
- Olivier de Berranger, bishop of Saint-Denis
- Pascal Roland, bishop of Moulins
- Albert Malbois, bishop emeritus of Évry

== Sources ==
- Société bibliographique (France) (1907). L'épiscopat français depuis le Concordat jusqu'à la Séparation (1802-1905). Paris: Librairie des Saints-Pères. pp. 346–350.
