= Louis-Paul-Armand Simonneaux =

French prelate

His Excellency Louis-Paul-Armand Simonneaux
- Bishop Emeritus of Versailles
- Church: Roman Catholic Church
- See: Diocese of Versailles
- In office: 1967–1988
- Predecessor: Alexandre Renard
- Successor: Jean-Charles Thomas

Orders
- Ordination: 10 March 1946
- Consecration: 26 November 1967 by Mgr Paul Joseph Marie Gouyon

Personal details
- Born: 19 January 1916 Servon-sur-Vilaine, France
- Died: 22 January 2009 (aged 93)
- Coat of arms

Louis-Paul-Armand Simonneaux (19 January 1916 – 22 January 2009) was a French prelate of the Roman Catholic Church and was one of the oldest living bishops and one of oldest French bishops at the time of his death.

== Biography ==
Simonneaux was born in Servon-sur-Vilaine, France and was ordained a priest on 10 March 1946. He was appointed to the Diocese of Versailles on 30 September 1967 and ordained bishop on 26 November 1967. He remained bishop of Versailles until 4 June 1988.

Catholic Church titles
Preceded by Alexandre Renard	Catholic Bishop of Versailles; 1967–1988	Succeeded by Jean-Charles Thomas
