= Joseph-Clair Reyne =

French Roman Catholic Bishop

Joseph-Clair Reyne (4 January 1824 – 14 November 1872) was a French clergyman and bishop for the Roman Catholic Diocese of Basse-Terre. Reyne was born in Manosque. He became ordained in 1848. He was appointed bishop in 1870. He died on 14 November 1872, at the age of 48.
