= Jacques Fihey =

French Roman Catholic bishop

- Bishop of Coutances
- Church: Catholic Church
- See: Bishop of Coutances
- Installed: 22 June 1989
- Term ended: 1 October 2006
- Predecessor: Joseph Wicquart
- Successor: Stanislas Lalanne

Orders
- Ordination: 29 June 1955
- Consecration: 10 July 1977 by Michel Vial

Personal details
- Born: 1 October 1931 Narbonne, France
- Died: 12 March 2017 (aged 85) Nantes, France

Jacques Louis Marie Joseph Fihey (1 October 1931 – 12 March 2017) was a French Roman Catholic bishop.

Ordained to the priesthood in 1955, Fihey served as auxiliary bishop of the Roman Catholic Archdiocese of Marseille, France, from 1977 to 1989. He then served as bishop of the Roman Catholic Diocese of Coutances from 1989 to 2006.
