= Versailles Cathedral =

Cathedral in Yvelines, France

Versailles Cathedral Cathedral of Saint Louis, Versailles Cathédrale Saint-Louis de Versailles
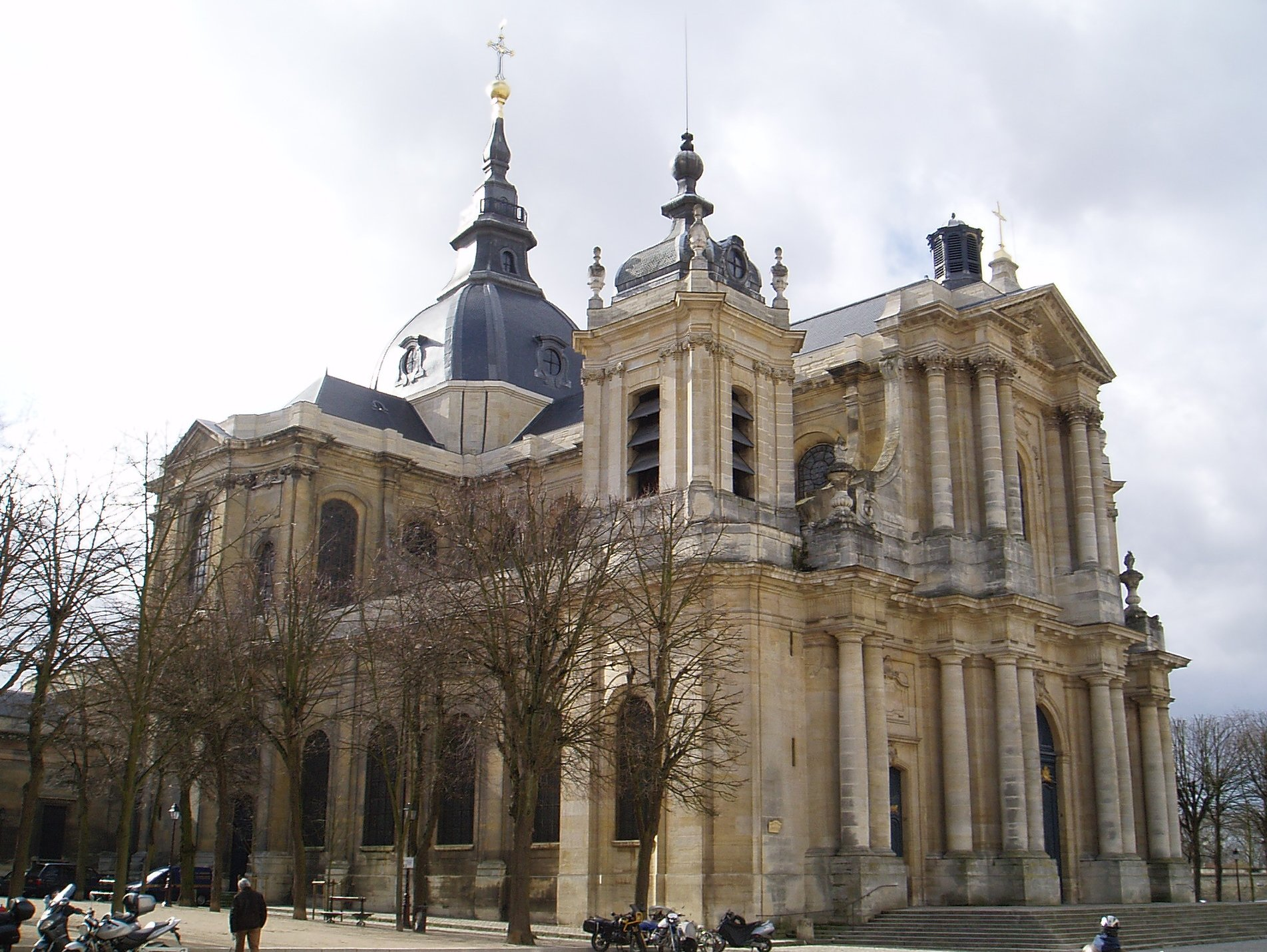
- Versailles Cathedral

Religion
- Affiliation: Roman Catholic Church
- Diocese: Diocese of Versailles
- Ecclesiastical or organizational status: Cathedral
- Year consecrated: 1843

Location
- Location: Versailles, Yvelines, France
- Interactive map of Versailles Cathedral; Cathedral of Saint Louis, Versailles; Cathédrale Saint-Louis de Versailles
- Coordinates: 48°47′54″N 2°7′27″E

Architecture
- Type: church
- Style: Baroque
- Groundbreaking: 1743
- Completed: 1754

Versailles Cathedral (French: Cathédrale Saint-Louis de Versailles) is a Roman Catholic church located in Versailles, France. It is a national monument.

It is the seat of the Bishop of Versailles, created as a constitutional bishopric in 1790 and confirmed by the Concordat of 1801.

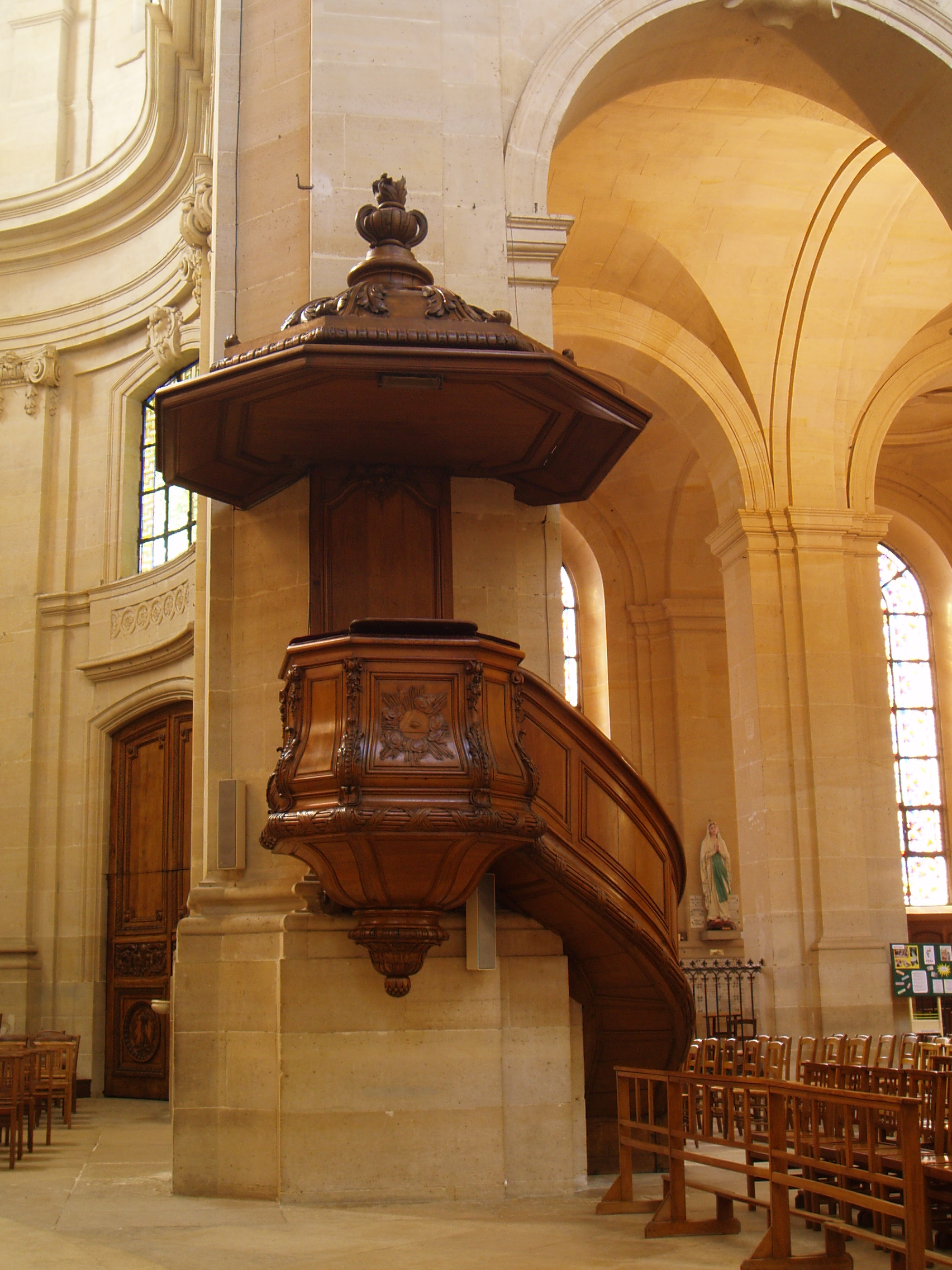
Interior with pulpit

It was built as the parish church of Saint Louis before becoming the cathedral of the new diocese. The building is of the mid-18th century: the first stone was laid, by Louis XV, on 12 June 1743 and the church was consecrated on 24 August 1754. The architect was Jacques Hardouin-Mansart de Sagonne (1711-1778), a grandson of the famous architect Jules Hardouin-Mansart. In 1764 Louis-François Trouard added the Chapelle de la Providence (now the Chapelle des Catéchismes) to the northern transept.

During the French Revolution it was used as a Temple of Abundance, and badly defaced.

It was chosen and used as the cathedral by the post-Revolutionary bishop, who preferred it to the church of Notre-Dame in Versailles, which had been the choice of the preceding constitutional bishop. Its consecration as a cathedral was however severely delayed, and was not performed until 1843, by the diocese's third bishop, Louis-Marie-Edmond Blanquart de Bailleul.

== Sources ==
- Catholic Hierarchy: Diocese of Versailles
- Catholic Encyclopedia: Versailles
