= Jean-Charles Thomas =

French Roman Catholic bishop (1929–2023)

His Excellency Jean-Charles Thomas
- Bishop Emeritus of Versailles
- Archdiocese: Paris
- Predecessor: Louis Simonneaux
- Successor: Éric Aumonier
- Previous posts: Auxiliary Bishop of Aire and Dax and Titular Bishop of Gemellae in Numidia (1972–1974); Bishop of Ajaccio (1974–1986)

Orders
- Ordination: 5 July 1953 by Antoine-Marie Cazaux
- Consecration: 1 May 1972 by Charles-Auguste-Marie Paty

Personal details
- Born: 16 December 1929 Saint-Martin-des-Noyers, France
- Died: 14 October 2023 (aged 93) Machecoul, France
- Motto: COMPRENDRE, AIMER, SERVIR
- Coat of arms: Jean-Charles Thomas's coat of arms

Styles of Jean-Charles Thomas
- Reference style: His Excellency; The Most Reverend
- Spoken style: Your Excellency
- Religious style: Bishop

Jean-Charles Thomas (16 December 1929 – 14 October 2023) was a French Catholic bishop. He was ordained on July 5, 1953, and was incardinated in the clergy of the Diocese of Luçon.

On 13 March 1972, he was named by Pope Paul VI, titular bishop of Gemellae in Numidia and appointed him auxiliary bishop in Aire and Dax. The bishop of Luçon, Mgr. Charles-Auguste-Marie Paty, gave him on 1 May of the same year, the episcopal ordination; Co-consecrators were the Archbishop Marius-Félix-Antoine Maziers, and the Bishop André Pierre Louis Marie Fauchet. On 4 February he was named by Pope Paul VI Bishop of Ajaccio. Then he was named on 23 December 1986, Coadjutor bishop of Versailles, and Bishop of Versailles on the 4 June 1988. On the 11 January 2001, the Pope Jean-Paul II accepted his demission and named Éric Aumonier to succeed him.

Thomas died in Machecoul on 14 October 2023, at the age of 93.

Catholic Church titles
Preceded by Louis Simonneaux	Catholic Bishop of Versailles; 1988–2001	Succeeded by Éric Aumonier
Preceded by André Charles Collini	Catholic Bishop of Ajaccio; 1974–1986	Succeeded by Sauveur Casanova
Preceded by Roger Etchegaray	Titular Bishop of Gemellae in Numidia; 1972–1974	Succeeded by Joseph Mercieca
Preceded by —	Auxiliary Bishop of Aire and Dax; 1972–1974	Succeeded by —
