= Diocese of Basse-Terre =

Latin Catholic ecclesiastical jurisdiction in the Caribbean

Diocese of Basse-Terre and Pointe-à-Pitre Dioecesis Imae Telluris et Petrirostrensis Diocèse de Basse-Terre et Pointe-à-Pitre
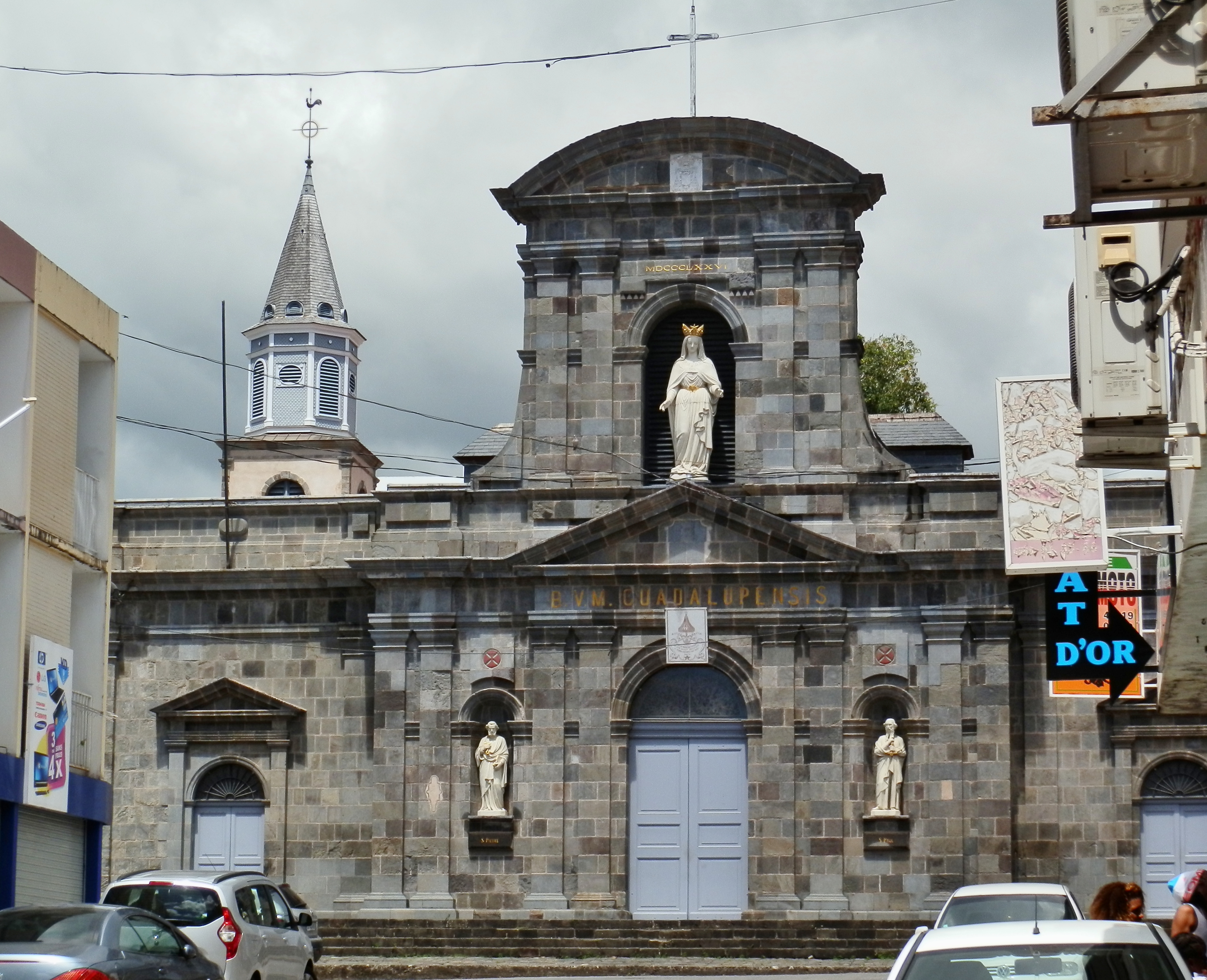
- Basilique-Cathédrale Notre-Dame de Guadeloupe

Location
- Country: Guadeloupe, France Saint Barthélemy, France Saint Martin, France
- Ecclesiastical province: Province of Fort-de-France
- Metropolitan: Archdiocese of Fort-de-France
- Coordinates: 15.9959°N 61.7298°W

Statistics
- Area: 1,780 km^{2} (690 sq mi)
- Population: Total; Catholics: (as of 2012); 467,000; 390,000 (83.5%)
- Parishes: 42

Information
- Denomination: Catholic Church
- Rite: Latin Rite
- Established: 27 September 1850 (175 years ago)
- Cathedral: Basilique-Cathédrale Notre-Dame de Guadeloupe

Current leadership
- Pope: Leo XIV
- Bishop: Philippe Guiougou
- Metropolitan Archbishop: David Macaire
- Bishops emeritus: Jean-Yves Riocreux Bishop Emeritus (2012-2021)

Website
- www.catholique-guadeloupe.info

The Diocese of Basse-Terre and Pointe-à-Pitre (Latin: Dioecesis Imae Telluris et Petrirostrensis; French: Diocèse de Basse-Terre et Pointe-à-Pitre), more simply known as the Diocese of Basse-Terre, is a diocese of the Latin Church of the Catholic Church in the Caribbean.

The diocese comprises the entirety of the French overseas department of Guadeloupe, one of the Leeward Lesser Antilles. It is also responsible for parishes in the small overseas departments of Saint Barthélemy and Saint Martin. The diocese is a suffragan of the Metropolitan Archdiocese of Fort-de-France, and both are members of the Antilles Episcopal Conference.

Its cathedral, dedicated to Our Lady of Guadalupe (the island's eponymous 'Mexican' patron saint), which has the status of a minor basilica, is hence known as the Basilique-Cathédrale Notre-Dame de Guadeloupe de Basse-Terre or the Basse-Terre Cathedral.

== History ==
It was erected in 1850, as the Diocese of Guadeloupe and Basse-Terre, on territory split off from the then Apostolic Prefecture of Îles de la Terre Ferme (an Antillian missionary jurisdiction, which was promoted to diocese of Martinique and meanwhile became the Archdiocese of Fort-de-France), its present Metropolitan.

The bishopric was renamed in 1951 to the present name, Diocese of Basse-Terre. Also on 19 July 1951, it was united with the thus suppressed diocese of Pointe-à-Pitre (on Grande Terre, which still has its former cathedral of St. Peter and Paul), so its incumbents' (rarely used) full title is bishop of Basse-Terre-Pointe-à-Pitre.

== Bishops ==
All Latin (Roman Rite). Most bishops were secular; a few belonged to specified religious congregations.

=== Incumbent ordinaries ===
Bishops of Guadeloupe and Basse-Terre

- Pierre-Marie-Gervais Lacarrière (1850–1853)
- Théodore-Augustin Forcade, Paris Foreign Missions Society (M.E.P.) (1853–1861), appointed Bishop of Nevers
- Antoine Boutonnet (1862–1868)
- Joseph-Clair Reyne (1869–1872)
- François-Benjamin-Joseph Blanger (1873–1883), appointed Bishop of Limoges
- Fédéric-Henri Oury (1884–1886), appointed Bishop of Fréjus
- Pierre-Marie Avon (1899–1901)
- Emmanuel-François Canappe (1901–1907)
- Pierre-Louis Genoud, Holy Ghost Fathers (C.S.Sp.) (1912–1945)
- Jean Gay, C.S.Sp. (1945–see below)

Bishops of Basse-Terre(-Pointe-à-Pitre)

- Jean Gay, C.S.Sp. (as above–1968)
- Siméon Oualli (1970–1984)
- Ernest Mesmin Lucien Cabo (1984–2008)
- Jean-Yves Riocreux (2012–2021)

=== Coadjutor bishop ===
- Jean Gay, C.S.Sp. (1943–1945)

=== Auxiliary bishop ===
- Ernest Mesmin Lucien Cabo (1983–1984), appointed bishop here

== See also ==
- Church of Our Lady of the Assumption, Lorient

== Sources and external links ==
- Diocèse de Guadeloupe official site (in French)
- GigaCatholic, with incumbent biographies
- "Diocese of Basse-Terre". Catholic-Hierarchy.
