= Hôtel de Ville, Versailles =

Town hall in Versailles, France

Hôtel de Ville
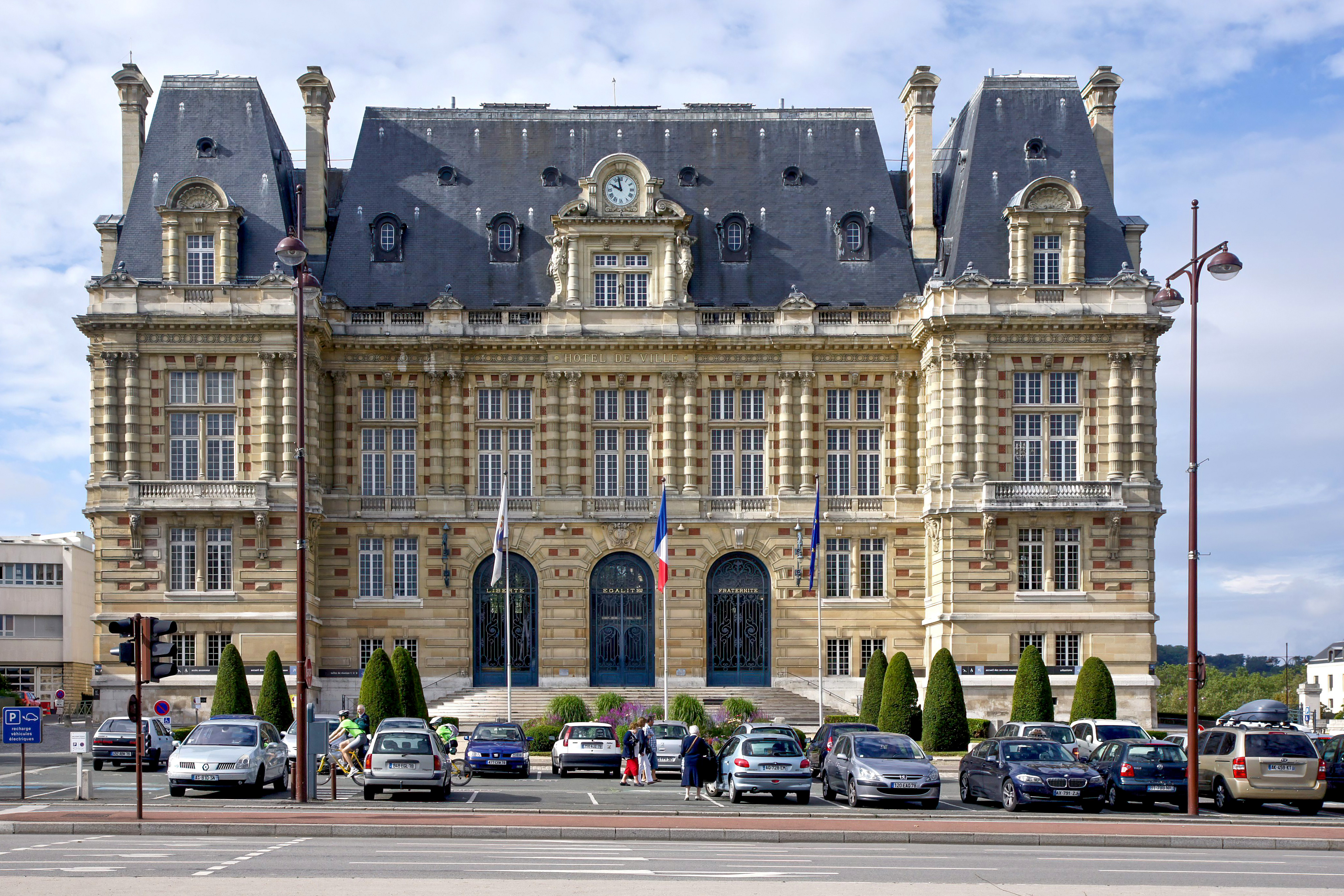
- The main frontage of the Hôtel de Ville in August 2012
- Interactive map of the Hôtel de Ville area

General information
- Type: City hall
- Architectural style: Châteauesque style
- Location: Versailles, France
- Coordinates: 48.8013°N 2.1301°E
- Completed: 1900

Design and construction
- Architect: Henry Legrand

The Hôtel de Ville (French pronunciation: [otɛl də vil], City Hall) is a municipal building in Versailles, Yvelines to the west of Paris, France, standing on Avenue de Paris.

== History ==
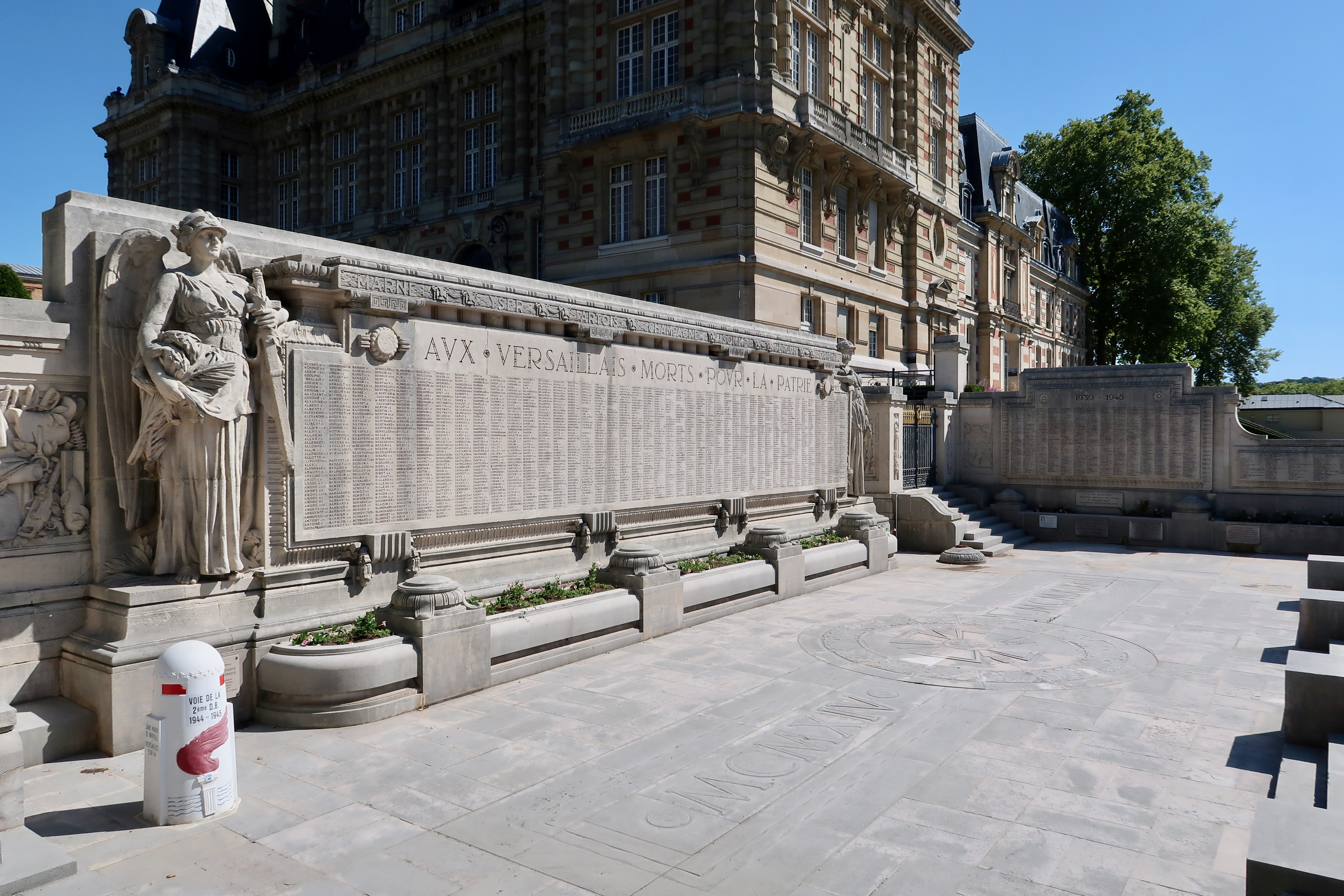
The war memorial

The oldest part of the complex is the east wing which was commissioned by Bernardin Gigault de Bellefonds, who was a Marshal of France and head of the Maison du Roi (royal household) under King Louis XIV. It was designed the neoclassical style, built in red brick with stone dressings and was completed in 1670. It was then acquired by the king to accommodate his son, Louis, Count of Vermandois, in 1680. After the count died in 1683, it passed to his sister, Marie Anne, Princess of Conti. Marie Anne entertained in the building, which became known as the Hôtel de Conti.

After Marie Anne sold the building to a property speculator in 1715, it was acquired by King Louis XV to accommodate the Grand-Maître (head of the royal household), Louis Henri, Duke of Bourbon, in 1723. Louis Henri also entertained in the building, which became known as the Hôtel du Grand-Maître.

During the French Revolution, the building was abandoned but, in 1790, town council, which had previously been accommodated in the Hôtel du Garde-Meuble in Rue des Réservoirs, decided to use it for meetings. The situation was regularised in 1823 when the state granted the council a long lease. The main frontage remained on Avenue de Berry (now the Avenue du Général-de-Gaulle) but it was improved with the addition of two small pavilions, a bell tower and a gate, all of which were demolished later in the century. By the late 19th century, the building was too cramped and the council decided to expand the complex with a new main frontage on Avenue de Paris, and a new west wing to create symmetry with the original east wing. The new structures were designed by Henry Legrand in a similar style and construction to the original east wing and were officially opened by the mayor, Edouard Lefebvre, on 18 November 1900.

The new design involved a symmetrical main frontage of seven bays facing onto Avenue de Paris with the end bays projected forward as pavilions. The central section of five bays featured a short flight of steps leading up to three round headed openings with voussoirs, keystones and iron grills. The outer bays of the central section were fenestrated with pairs of bipartite windows, stacked vertically, on the ground floor, while the bays on the first floor were fenestrated with tall cross windows. The end bays were fenestrated in a similar style. The windows on the first floor were flanked by pairs of banded Corinthian order columns supporting a frieze, a modillioned cornice and a balustaded parapet. Above the central bay, there was a cross window flanked by atlantes supporting a cornice and a clock with a moulded surround. There were also dormer windows with ornate surrounds above the end bays. Internally, the principal room was the Salle du Conseil (council chamber).

A war memorial in the form of a wall inscribed with the names of local service personnel who had died in the First World War was designed by Albert Guilbert, with sculptures created by Ernest Henri Dubois, and unveiled to the northwest of the building on 11 November 1924.

In June 1940, during the Second World War, the German military commander established his office inside the town hall. The building continued to be used in this role until the liberation of the town by the French 2nd Armoured Division, commanded by General Philippe Leclerc, on 24 August 1944. A bell tower, located behind the clock, was deemed too tall and was demolished in 1945.
