= Emmanuel-François Canappe =

French bishop

Emmanuel-François Canappe (25 July 1849 – 20 September 1907) was a French clergyman and bishop for the Roman Catholic Diocese of Basse-Terre. Canappe was born in Wailly, France. He became ordained in 1872. He was appointed bishop in 1901.
