= Arabelle Raphael =

French pornographic film actress (born 1988/1989)

- Raphael in a video for OnlyFans, 2023
- Born: 1988 or 1989 (age 37–38); France
- Occupations: Pornographic film actress; sex worker; activist
- Website: arabelleraphael.com

Arabelle Raphael (born 1988 or 1989) is a pornographic film actress, sex worker, and sex-worker activist based in California.

== Early life ==
Raphael was born in France to a French and Tunisian mother and an Iranian Jewish father. Her family immigrated to the San Francisco Bay Area when she was five years old.

== Pornographic film career ==
Raphael began working in the sex industry in 2010 and would go on to perform "almost every form" of sex work, including performing at The Lusty Lady, a worker-owned strip club in San Francisco, as well as working as a prostitute. Her first pornographic film role was for Kink.com, also in San Francisco. She co-directed the film All My Mother's Lovers (2017) for Grooby Productions, which was awarded "Most Tantalizing Trans Film" at the Toronto International Porn Festival.

Raphael has said she has had difficulty finding work because of her extensive tattoos, a relatively uncommon feature in mainstream pornography. As a result, she built her initial following on Tumblr, a popular site for hosting alternative porn before sexually explicit imagery was banned from the site. She has said mainstream porn producers either fetishized her ethnic appearance or attempted to make her appear more white early in her career.

Raphael would see her income from content produced for OnlyFans increase sixfold during the COVID-19 pandemic. She eventually began using the website as a full-time occupation. In 2022, she appeared in Raw 44, distributed by Jules Jordan Video and directed by and starring Manuel Ferrara.

== Artwork ==
Raphael contributed a series of photographs for a 2017 exhibition at San Francisco's SOMArts. The images depict Raphael reenacting scenarios from hate mail she has received for being a sex worker online. She has also directed a short experimental film titled La Nuisance and written poetry and personal and opinion essays for publication.

== Activism ==
Following the passage of FOSTA-SESTA in 2018, Raphael organized a meeting covering cybersecurity, closures of websites formerly offering sex work advertising, and plans for sharing resources among Bay Area sex workers. Raphael and Maxine Holloway also founded the organization Bay Pros Support, with the goal of calling attention to the difficulty sex workers encountered maintaining their safety and business relationships in the wake of the law's passage.

== Personal life ==
Raphael has stated that her sexuality is bisexual or pansexual. As of 2018, she lived in the East Bay region of California.

== Awards ==
- 2025 Pornhub Award – Favorite Inked Model
