= Diocese of Pontoise =

Catholic diocese in France

Coordinates: 49.05°N 2.10°E

Diocese of Pontoise Dioecesis Pontisarensis Diocèse de Pontoise

Catholic
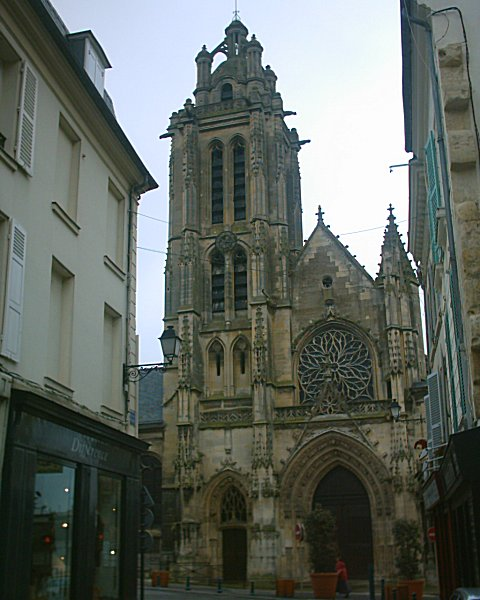
- Pontoise Cathedral

Location
- Country: France
- Ecclesiastical province: Paris
- Metropolitan: Archdiocese of Paris

Statistics
- Area: 1,248 km^{2} (482 sq mi)
- Population: Total; Catholics: (as of 2023); 1,251,804 ▲; 885,000 (est.) ▲
- Parishes: 60 ▲

Information
- Denomination: Catholic Church
- Sui iuris church: Latin Church
- Rite: Roman Rite
- Established: 9 October 1966
- Cathedral: Cathedral of St. Malo in Pontoise
- Secular priests: 105 (Diocesan) ▼43 (Religious Orders) ▼30 Permanent Deacons ▲

Current leadership
- Pope: Leo XIV
- Bishop: Benoît Bertrand
- Metropolitan Archbishop: Laurent Ulrich

Map

Website
- Website of the Diocese

The Diocese of Pontoise (Latin: Dioecesis Pontisarensis; French: Diocèse de Pontoise) is a Latin Church ecclesiastical territory or diocese of the Catholic Church in France. The commune of Pontoise is about 35 km (22 mi) north west of Paris, north of the Seine. Established in 1966, the Diocese of Pontoise was composed of territory split off from the Diocese of Versailles, and including a large part of the Vexin. The diocese is a suffragan diocese in the ecclesiastical province of the metropolitan Archdiocese of Paris.

== History ==
Until the French Revolution, the parishes now contained in the diocese of Pontoise had belonged to several dioceses of the ancien regime: Rouen, Paris, Beauvais and Senlis. As a result of the creation of the system of "departments," Pontoise became part of the diocese of Versailles, called the diocese of Seine-et-Oise in the constitutional church (1791–1801).

The diocese of Pontoise was created by Pope Paul VI, in the bull "Qui Deo Volente," on 9 October 1966, in carrying out the norms established by the Second Vatican Council (1962–1965), as part of a restructuring of the two very populous dioceses of Paris and Versailles. It was also made desirable due to the redrawing of civil boundaries in the region of Paris.

The first bishop of Pontoise, André Rousset, was appointed by the pope on 9 October 1966. He had previously been titular bishop of Vaga (Africa Proconsularis, Tunisia) and Auxiliary Bishop of Versailles (1963–1966).

The first ordinations of new priests since its founding in 1966 occurred in 2011, when four men were ordained priests for the diocese. The bull of foundation had required that all seminarians belonged to the diocesan territory in which they had their legal residence or in which the parish to which they belonged was situated.

== Cathedral ==
The Church Saint-Maclou became the Diocese of Pontoise's cathedral when the diocese was created in 1966. Exceptionally among French Catholic dioceses, Pontoise owns its own cathedral. Many cathedrals in the country are owned by the French state.

== Bishops of Pontoise ==
- (1966–1988) : André Rousset
- (1988–1999) : Thierry Romain Camille Jordan
- (2000–2003) : Hervé Jean Luc Renaudin
- (2003–2012) : Jean-Yves Riocreux
- (2013–2024) : Stanislas Lalanne
- (4 June 2024 – ) : Benoît Bertrand
