= Alexandre Renard =

French Roman Catholic Cardinal and Archbishop of Lyon

His Eminence Alexandre Renard
- Cardinal, Archbishop Emeritus of Lyon
- Church: Roman Catholic Church
- Archdiocese: Lyon
- See: Lyon
- Appointed: 28 May 1967
- Term ended: 29 October 1981
- Predecessor: Jean-Marie Villot
- Successor: Albert Decourtray
- Other post: Cardinal-Priest of Santissima Trinità al Monte Pincio (1976–83)
- Previous posts: Bishop of Versailles (1953–67); Cardinal-Priest of San Francesco di Paola ai Monti "pro hac vice" (1967–76)

Orders
- Ordination: 12 July 1931
- Consecration: 19 October 1953 by Achille Liénart
- Created cardinal: 26 June 1967 by Pope Paul VI
- Rank: Cardinal-Priest

Personal details
- Born: Alexandre-Charles-Albert-Joseph Renard; 7 June 1906 Avelin, French Third Republic
- Died: 8 October 1983 (aged 77) Cliníque Saint-Jean de Dieu, Paris, France
- Buried: Lyon Cathedral
- Parents: Jules Constant Jacques Renard; Claire Victorine Delos
- Education: Lille Catholic University
- Motto: In fidem ex fide
- Coat of arms

Styles of Alexandre Renard
- Reference style: His Eminence
- Spoken style: Your Eminence
- Informal style: Cardinal
- See: Lyon

Alexandre-Charles-Albert-Joseph Renard (7 June 1906, Avelin, Nord – 8 October 1983, Paris) was a French Roman Catholic Cardinal and Archbishop of Lyon. He was ordained on 12 July 1931 in Lille.

== Life and career ==
He taught at Marcq College, Baraeul in 1933–1936, and then taught at the seminary of Haubourdin until 1938. He continued his teaching through the Second World War at the Catholic University of Lille until 1943, and also did pastoral work in the diocese of Lille until 1947.

On 19 August 1953 Pope Pius XII appointed Renard Bishop of Versailles, and on 28 May 1967 he was appointed to the metropolitan see of Lyon by Pope Paul VI. He was created Cardinal-Priest of SS. Trinità al Monte Pincio on 26 June 1967 by Pope Paul.

He took part in both conclaves of 1978 that elected Pope John Paul I and Pope John Paul II. He retired as Archbishop at the age of 75. Cardinal Renard died 1983 after a surgery, at the age of 77.

Catholic Church titles
| Preceded by Jean-Marie Villot | Archbishop of Lyon; 28 May 1967 – 29 October 1981 | Succeeded by Albert Decourtray |
| Preceded by Benjamin-Octave Roland-Gosselin | Bishop of Versailles; 1953–1967 | Succeeded by Louis-Paul-Armand Simonneaux |
