= Versailles, Yvelines =

Prefecture of Yvelines, Île-de-France

Versailles
- Prefecture and commune
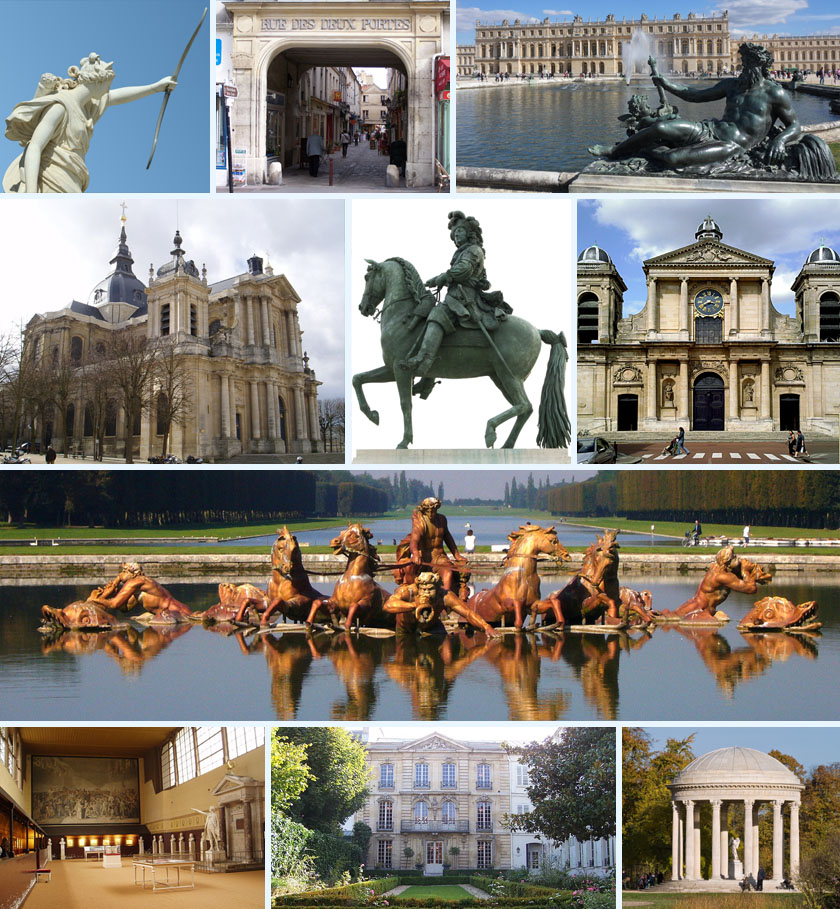
- From top left to bottom right: Le Soir ("The Evening" in the gardens of Versailles); rue des Deux-Portes; the Château de Versailles taken from the gardens; Versailles Cathedral; equestrian statue of Louis XIV, place d'Armes, in front of the Château; Church of Notre-Dame, Versailles, parish church of the Château; the bassin d'Apollon in the gardens of Versailles; la salle du Jeu de paume (where the Tennis Court Oath was signed); the Musée Lambinet (municipal museum of Versailles); the Temple de l'Amour ("Temple of Love", garden of the Petit Trianon)

- Coat of arms

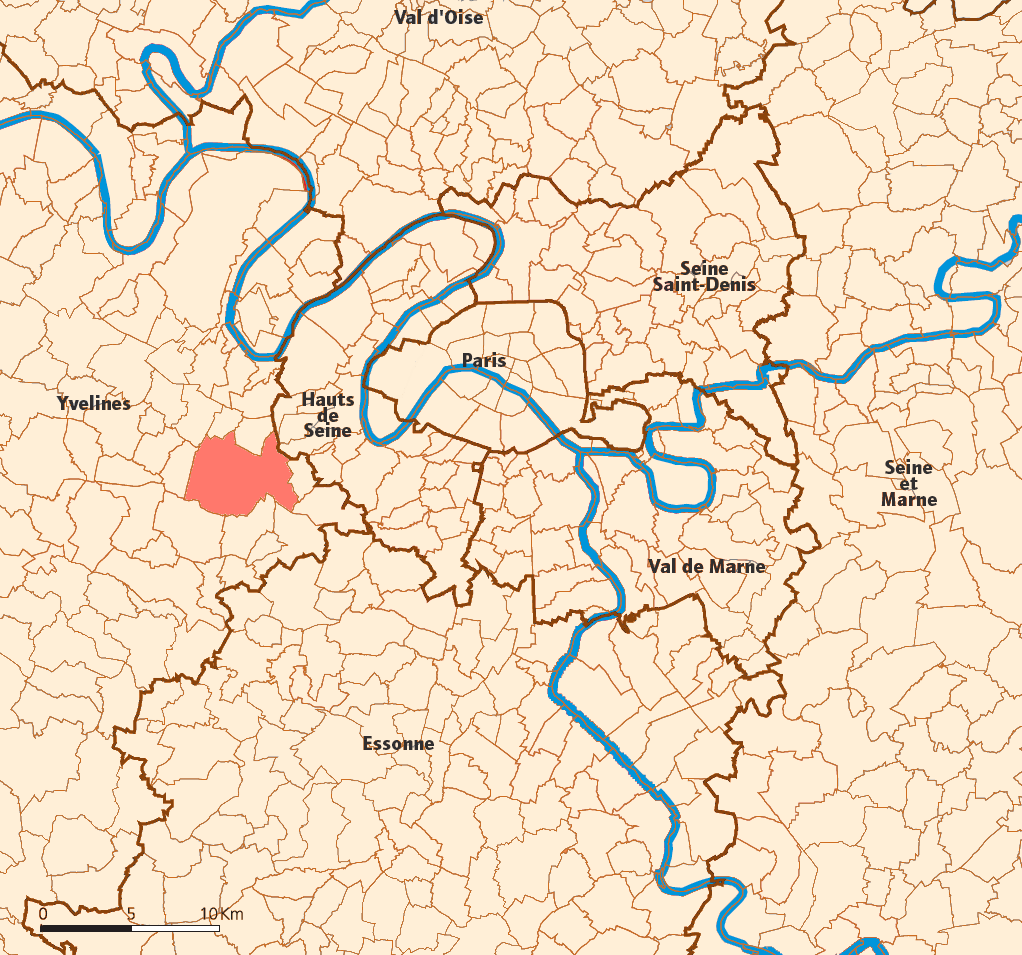
- Location (in red) within Paris inner and outer suburbs
- Location of Versailles
- Location within France Location within Île-de-France (region)
- Coordinates: 48°48′18″N 2°08′06″E
- Country: France
- Region: Île-de-France
- Department: Yvelines
- Arrondissement: Versailles
- Canton: Versailles-1 and 2
- Intercommunality: CA Versailles Grand Parc

Government
  - Mayor (2020–2026): François de Mazières (DVD)
- Area^{1}: 26.18 km^{2} (10.11 sq mi)
- Elevation: 132 m (433 ft)
- Highest elevation: 180 m (590 ft)
- Lowest elevation: 103 m (338 ft)
- Population (2023): 84,095
  - Density: 3,212/km^{2} (8,320/sq mi)
- Demonym: Versaillais
- Time zone: UTC+01:00 (CET)
  - Summer (DST): UTC+02:00 (CEST)
- INSEE/Postal code: 78646 /78000
- Website: www.versailles.fr
- ^{1} French Land Register data, which excludes lakes, ponds, glaciers > 1 km^{2} (0.386 sq mi or 247 acres) and river estuaries.

Versailles (/vɛərˈsaɪ, vɜːrˈsaɪ/ vair-SY, vur-SY; French: [vɛʁsɑj]) is a commune in the department of Yvelines, Île-de-France. It is known for the Château de Versailles and the Gardens of Versailles, the latter of which is designated a UNESCO World Heritage Site. Located in the western suburbs of the French capital, 17.1 km (10.6 mi) from the centre of Paris, Versailles is a wealthy suburb of Paris with a service-based economy and is a major tourist destination. As of 2023, its population was 84,095, down from a peak of 94,145 in 1975.

A new town founded by order of King Louis XIV, Versailles was the de facto capital of the Kingdom of France for over a century, from 1682 to 1789, before becoming the cradle of the French Revolution. After having lost its status as a royal city, it became the préfecture (regional capital) of the Seine-et-Oise département in 1790, then of Yvelines in 1968. It is also a Roman Catholic diocese.

Versailles is historically known for numerous treaties such as the Treaty of Paris, which ended the American Revolution, and the Treaty of Versailles after World War I. Today, the Congress of France – the name given to the body created when both houses of the French Parliament, the National Assembly and the Senate – gathers in the Château de Versailles to vote on revisions to the Constitution.

== Name ==
The etymology of Versailles is thought to be from the Latin word versare, meaning "to keep turning, turn over and over", an expression used in medieval times for ploughed lands, cleared lands (lands that had been repeatedly "turned over"). This word formation is similar to Latin seminare ("to sow"), which gave French semailles ("sowings", "sown seeds").

During the Revolution of 1789, city officials proposed to rename Versailles Berceau-de-la-Liberté ("Cradle of Liberty"), but the proposal was retracted due to the objections of the majority of the population.

== A seat of power ==
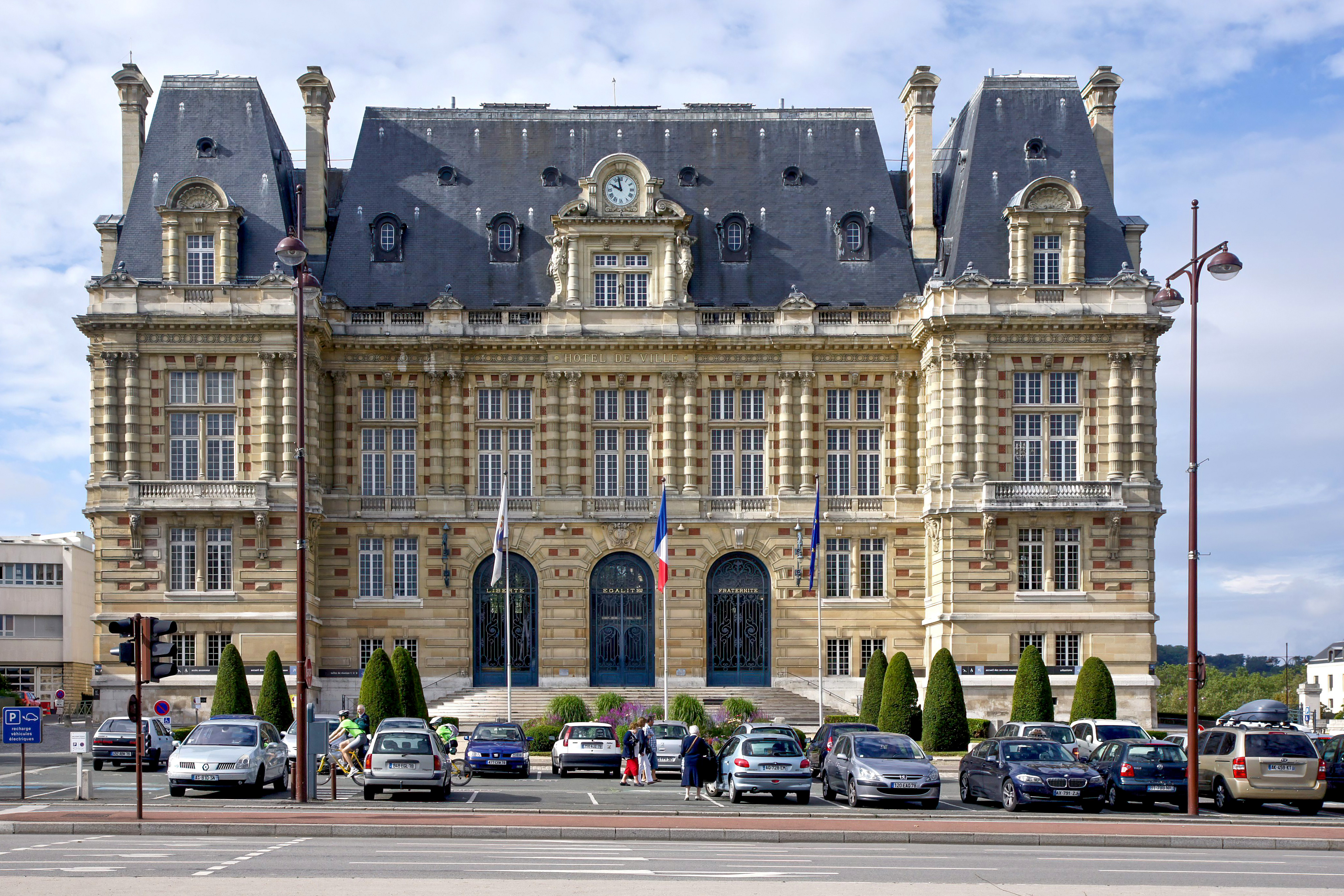
The Hôtel de Ville

From May 1682, when Louis XIV moved the court and government permanently to Versailles, until his death in September 1715, Versailles was the unofficial capital of the kingdom of France. For the next seven years, during the Régence of Philippe d'Orléans, the royal court of the young King Louis XV was at first in Paris, while the Regent governed from his Parisian residence, the Palais-Royal. Versailles was again the unofficial capital of France from June 1722, when Louis XV returned to Versailles, until October 1789, when a Parisian mob forced Louis XVI and the royal family to move to Paris. Versailles again became the unofficial capital of France from March 1871, when Adolphe Thiers' government took refuge in Versailles, fleeing the insurrection of the Paris Commune, until November 1879, when the newly elected government and parliament returned to Paris. During the various periods when government affairs were conducted from Versailles, Paris remained the official capital of France.

Versailles was made the préfecture of the Seine-et-Oise département at its inception in March 1790 (at which time Seine-et-Oise had approximately 420,000 inhabitants). By the 1960s, with the growth of the Paris suburbs, the Seine-et-Oise had reached more than 2 million inhabitants, and was deemed too large and ungovernable, and thus it was split into three départements in January 1968. Versailles was made the préfecture of the Yvelines département, the largest chunk of the former Seine-et-Oise. At the 2017 census the Yvelines had 1,438,266 inhabitants.

The Hôtel de Ville has been the meeting place of the town council since 1900.

Versailles is the seat of a Roman Catholic diocese (bishopric) which was created in 1790. The diocese of Versailles is subordinate to the archdiocese of Paris.

In 1975, Versailles was made the seat of a Court of Appeal whose jurisdiction covers the western suburbs of Paris.

Since 1972, Versailles has been the seat of one of France's 30 nationwide académies (districts) of the Ministry of National Education. The académie de Versailles, the largest of France's thirty académies by its number of pupils and students, is in charge of supervising all the elementary schools and high schools of the western suburbs of Paris.

Versailles is also an important node for the French army, a tradition going back to the monarchy with, for instance, the military camp of Satory and other institutions.

== Geography ==
Versailles is located 17.1 km (10.6 mi) west-southwest of the centre of Paris. The city sits on an elevated plateau, 130 to 140 metres (430 to 460 ft) above sea level (whereas the elevation of the centre of Paris is only 33 m (108 ft) above sea level), surrounded by wooded hills: in the north the forests of Marly and Fausses-Reposes, and in the south the forests of Satory and Meudon.

The city (commune) of Versailles has an area of 26.18 km^{2} (10.11 sq mi; 6,470 acres), which is a quarter of the area of the city of Paris. In 1989, Versailles had a population density of 3,344/km^{2} (8,660/mi^{2}), whereas Paris had a density of 20,696/km^{2} (53,600/mi^{2}).

Born out of the will of a king, Versailles has a rational and symmetrical grid of streets. By the standards of the 18th century, it was a very modern European city. It was also used as a model for the building of Washington, D.C., by Pierre Charles L'Enfant.

== Climate ==
Versailles has an oceanic climate (Köppen: Cfb). Summer days are usually warm and pleasant with average temperatures between 15 and 25 °C (59 and 77 °F), and a fair amount of sunshine. In the winter, sunshine is scarce; days are cool, and nights are cold but generally above freezing with low temperatures around 3 °C (37 °F). Light night frosts are however quite common, but the temperature seldom dips below −5 °C (23 °F). Snow falls every year, but rarely stays on the ground. The city sometimes sees light snow or flurries with or without accumulation.

Climate data for Versailles (Palace of Versailles), 1981–present
Month	Jan	Feb	Mar	Apr	May	Jun	Jul	Aug	Sep	Oct	Nov	Dec	Year
Record high °C (°F)	17.5 (63.5)	22.9 (73.2)	25.4 (77.7)	31.5 (88.7)	36.0 (96.8)	37.6 (99.7)	41.9 (107.4)	40.2 (104.4)	35.7 (96.3)	30.7 (87.3)	22.5 (72.5)	17.5 (63.5)	41.9 (107.4)
Mean daily maximum °C (°F)	6.9 (44.4)	9.1 (48.4)	13.0 (55.4)	16.4 (61.5)	20.4 (68.7)	23.5 (74.3)	25.9 (78.6)	25.8 (78.4)	22 (72)	17.2 (63.0)	11.5 (52.7)	8.1 (46.6)	16.7 (62.0)
Daily mean °C (°F)	5.4 (41.7)	6.1 (43.0)	9.3 (48.7)	11.9 (53.4)	15.6 (60.1)	18.6 (65.5)	20.8 (69.4)	20.7 (69.3)	17.3 (63.1)	13.5 (56.3)	8.8 (47.8)	5.9 (42.6)	12.8 (55.1)
Mean daily minimum °C (°F)	3.0 (37.4)	3.1 (37.6)	5.5 (41.9)	7.3 (45.1)	10.8 (51.4)	13.7 (56.7)	15.8 (60.4)	15.6 (60.1)	12.7 (54.9)	9.8 (49.6)	6.1 (43.0)	3.7 (38.7)	8.9 (48.1)
Record low °C (°F)	−13.8 (7.2)	−11.6 (11.1)	−6.2 (20.8)	−2.0 (28.4)	2.3 (36.1)	6.1 (43.0)	8.7 (47.7)	8.6 (47.5)	5.0 (41.0)	−1.0 (30.2)	−6.3 (20.7)	−8.0 (17.6)	−13.8 (7.2)
Average precipitation mm (inches)	53 (2.1)	43 (1.7)	50 (2.0)	55 (2.2)	68 (2.7)	55 (2.2)	61 (2.4)	57 (2.2)	54 (2.1)	64 (2.5)	53 (2.1)	62 (2.4)	674 (26.5)
Average precipitation days (≥ 1.0 mm)	10.5	9.4	10.6	9.3	9.9	8.4	7.9	7.8	8.0	10.1	10.6	11.1	113.6
Mean monthly sunshine hours	60.0	85.6	131.7	171.4	197.9	222.2	243.4	223.2	179.1	128.4	75.3	52.1	1,770.3
Source 1: Meteociel
Source 2: Weather2Travel (sunshine hours)

== History ==
The name of Versailles appears for the first time in a medieval document dated 1038. In the feudal system of medieval France, the lords of Versailles came directly under the king of France, with no intermediary overlords between them and the king; yet they were not very important lords. At the end of the 11th century, the village consisted of a castle and the Saint Julien church.

Its farming activity and its location on the road from Paris to Dreux and Normandy brought wealth to the village, culminating at the end of the 13th century, the so-called "century of Saint Louis", famous for the prosperity of northern France and the building of Gothic cathedrals. The 14th century brought the Black Death and the Hundred Years' War, and with them, death and destruction. At the end of the Hundred Years' War in the 15th century, the village started to recover, with a population of only 100 inhabitants.

In 1561, Martial de Loménie, Secretary of State for Finances under King Charles IX, became the lord of Versailles. He obtained permission to establish four annual fairs and a weekly market on Thursdays. At the time, Versailles only had 500 inhabitants. Loménie was murdered during the St. Bartholomew's Day massacre on 24 August 1572. In 1575, Albert de Gondi, a man from Florence who had come to France with Catherine de' Medici, bought the seigneury of Versailles.

=== Louis XIII ===
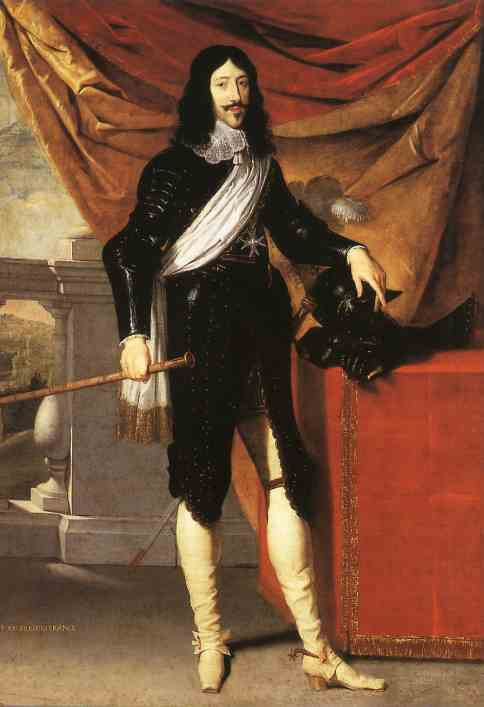
Louis XIII built the original hunting lodge that would become the Palace of Versailles under his son and successor Louis XIV.

Henceforth Versailles was the possession of the Gondi family, a family of wealthy and influential parliamentarians at the Parlement of Paris. Several times during the 1610s, the de Gondis invited King Louis XIII to hunt in the large forests around Versailles. In 1622, the king purchased a parcel of forest for his private hunting. In 1624, he acquired more land and entrusted Philibert Le Roy with the construction of a small hunting lodge built of red brick and stone with a slate roof. In 1632, the king bought the totality of the land and seigneury of Versailles from Jean-François de Gondi. The hunting lodge was enlarged to the size of a small château between 1632 and 1634.

At the time of Louis XIII's death in 1643, the village had 1,000 inhabitants.

This small château was the site of one of the historical events that took place during the reign of Louis XIII, on 10 November 1630, when, on the Day of the Dupes, the party of the queen mother was defeated and Richelieu was confirmed as Prime Minister.

=== Louis XIV ===
King Louis XIV, son of Louis XIII, was only four years old when his father died. It was 20 years later, in 1661, when Louis XIV commenced his personal reign, that the young king showed interest in Versailles. The idea of leaving Paris, where, as a child, he had experienced first-hand the insurrection of the Fronde, had never left him. Louis XIV commissioned his architect Le Vau and his landscape architect Le Nôtre to transform the castle of his father, as well as the park, in order to accommodate the court. In 1678, after the Treaty of Nijmegen, the king decided that the court and the government would be established permanently in Versailles, which happened on 6 May 1682.

At the same time, a new city was emerging from the ground, resulting from an ingenious decree of the king dated 22 May 1671, whereby the king authorized anyone to acquire a lot in the new city for free. There were only two conditions to acquire a lot: (1) a token tax of 5 shillings (5 sols) per arpent of land had to be paid every year ($0.03 per 1,000 sq ft (93 m2) per year in 2005 US dollars); and (2) a house had to be built on the lot according to the plans and models established by the Surintendant des Bâtiments du Roi (architect in chief of the royal demesne). The plans provided for a city built symmetrically with respect to the Avenue de Paris (which starts from the entrance of the castle). The roofs of the buildings and houses of the new city were not to exceed the level of the Marble Courtyard, at the entrance of the castle (built above a hill dominating the city), so that the perspective from the windows of the castle would not be obstructed.

The old village and the Saint Julien church were demolished to make room for buildings housing the administrative services managing the daily life in the castle. On both sides of the Avenue de Paris were built the Notre-Dame neighbourhood and the Saint-Louis neighbourhood, with new large churches, markets, and aristocratic mansions, all built in a very homogeneous style according to the models established by the Surintendant des Bâtiments du Roi. Versailles was a vast construction site for many years. Little by little, all those who needed or desired to live close to the centre of power came to Versailles. At the death of the Sun King in 1715, the village of Versailles had evolved into a city of approximately 30,000 inhabitants.

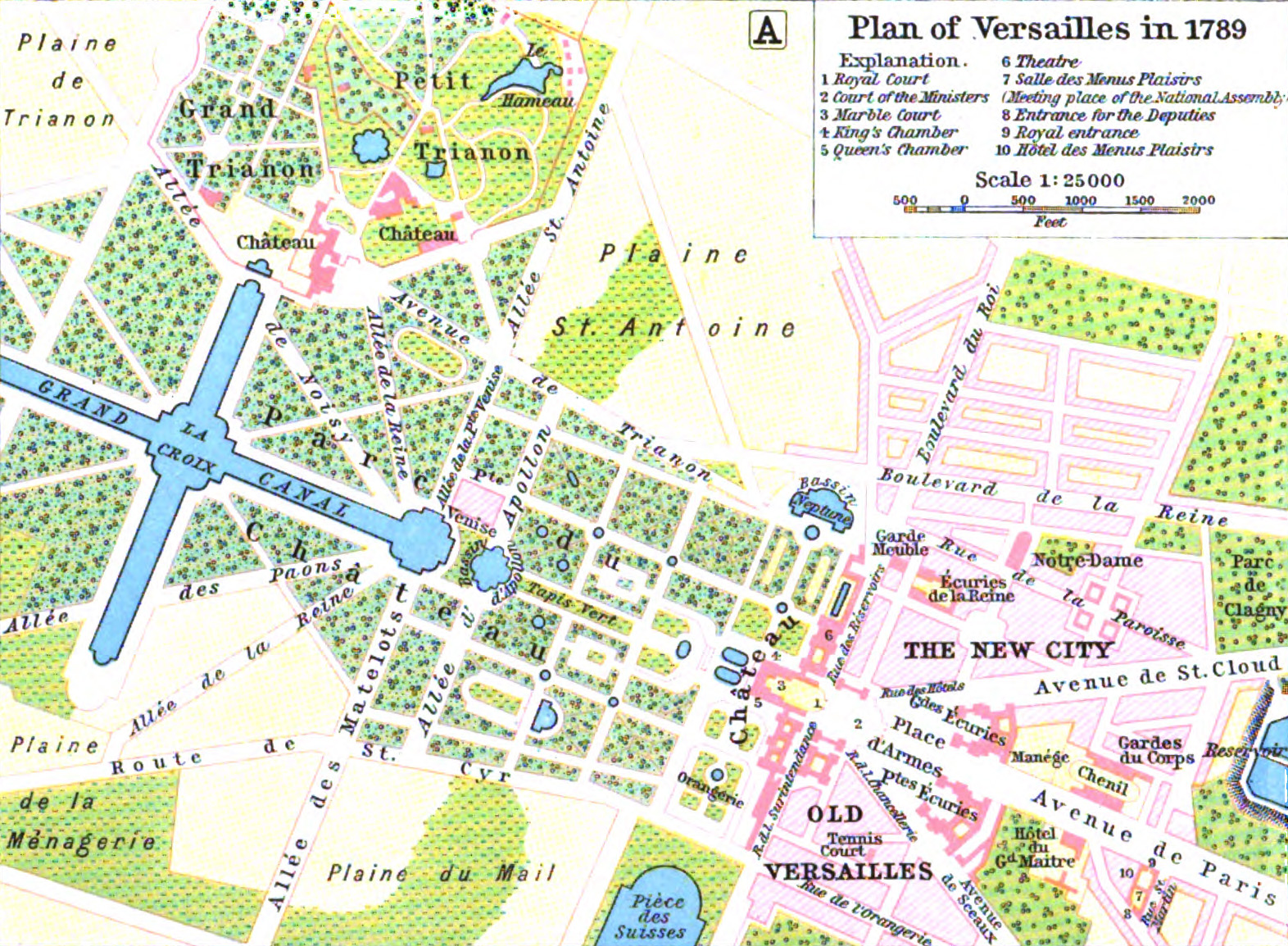
Versailles in 1789

=== Louis XV and Louis XVI ===
When the court of King Louis XV returned to Versailles in 1722, the city had 24,000 inhabitants. With the reign of Louis XV, Versailles grew even further. Versailles was the capital of the most powerful kingdom in Europe, and the whole of Europe admired its new architecture and design trends. Soon enough, the strict building rules decided under Louis XIV were not respected anymore, real estate speculation flourished, and the lots that had been given for free under Louis XIV were now on the market for hefty prices. By 1744, the population reached 37,000 inhabitants. The cityscape changed considerably under kings Louis XV and Louis XVI. Buildings were now taller. King Louis XV built a Ministry of War, a Ministry of Foreign Affairs (where the Treaty of Paris (1783) ending the American Revolutionary War was signed in 1783 with the United Kingdom), and a Ministry of the Navy. By 1789, the population had reached 60,000 inhabitants, and Versailles was now the seventh or eighth-largest city in France, and one of the largest cities in Europe.

=== French Revolution ===
As a seat of political power, Versailles naturally became the cradle of the French Revolution. The Estates-General met in Versailles on 5 May 1789. The members of the Third Estate took the Tennis Court Oath on 20 June 1789, and the National Constituent Assembly abolished feudalism on 4 August 1789. Eventually, on 5 and 6 October 1789, a crowd of women joined by some members of the national guard from Paris invaded the castle to protest bread prices and forced the royal family to move to Paris. The National Constituent Assembly followed the king to Paris soon afterwards, and Versailles lost its role as the capital city. During this turbulent time, Jean-François Coste, who had also been the chief physician of the King's Armies, was appointed mayor of Versailles.

From then on, Versailles lost a good deal of its inhabitants. From 60,000, the population had declined to 26,974 inhabitants by 1806. The castle, stripped of its furniture and ornaments during the Revolution, was left abandoned, with only Napoleon briefly staying one night there and then leaving the castle for good. Louis Philippe I, who took the throne in the July Revolution of 1830, transformed the palace into a National Museum dedicated to "all the glories of France" in 1837. Versailles had become a sleepy town, a place of pilgrimage for those nostalgic for the old monarchy.

=== 19th century to the present day ===
The Franco-Prussian War of 1870 put Versailles in the limelight again. On 18 January 1871, the victorious Germans proclaimed the king of Prussia, Wilhelm I, emperor of Germany in the very Hall of Mirrors of the castle, in an attempt to take revenge for the conquests of Louis XIV two centuries earlier. Then in March of the same year, following the insurrection of the Paris Commune, the French Third Republic government under Thiers relocated to Versailles, and from there directed the military suppression of the insurrection.

Restoration of a monarchy almost occurred in 1873, with parliament offering the crown to Henri, comte de Chambord, but his refusal to accept the tricolour flag that had been adopted during the Revolution made the restoration of the monarchy impossible for the time being. Versailles again became the political centre of France, active with diplomatic discussions and political rumours, with its population briefly peaking at 61,686 in 1872, matching the record population level reached on the eve of the French Revolution 83 years earlier. Eventually, however, left-wing republicans won a string of parliamentary elections, defeating the parties supporting a restoration of the monarchy, and the new majority decided to relocate the government to Paris in November 1879. Versailles then experienced a new population setback (48,324 inhabitants at the 1881 census). After that, Versailles never again functioned as the seat of the capital of France, but the presence of the French Parliament there in the 1870s left a vast hall, built in one aisle of the palace, which the French Parliament uses when it meets in Congress to amend the French Constitution, as well as when the President of France addresses the two chambers of the French Parliament.

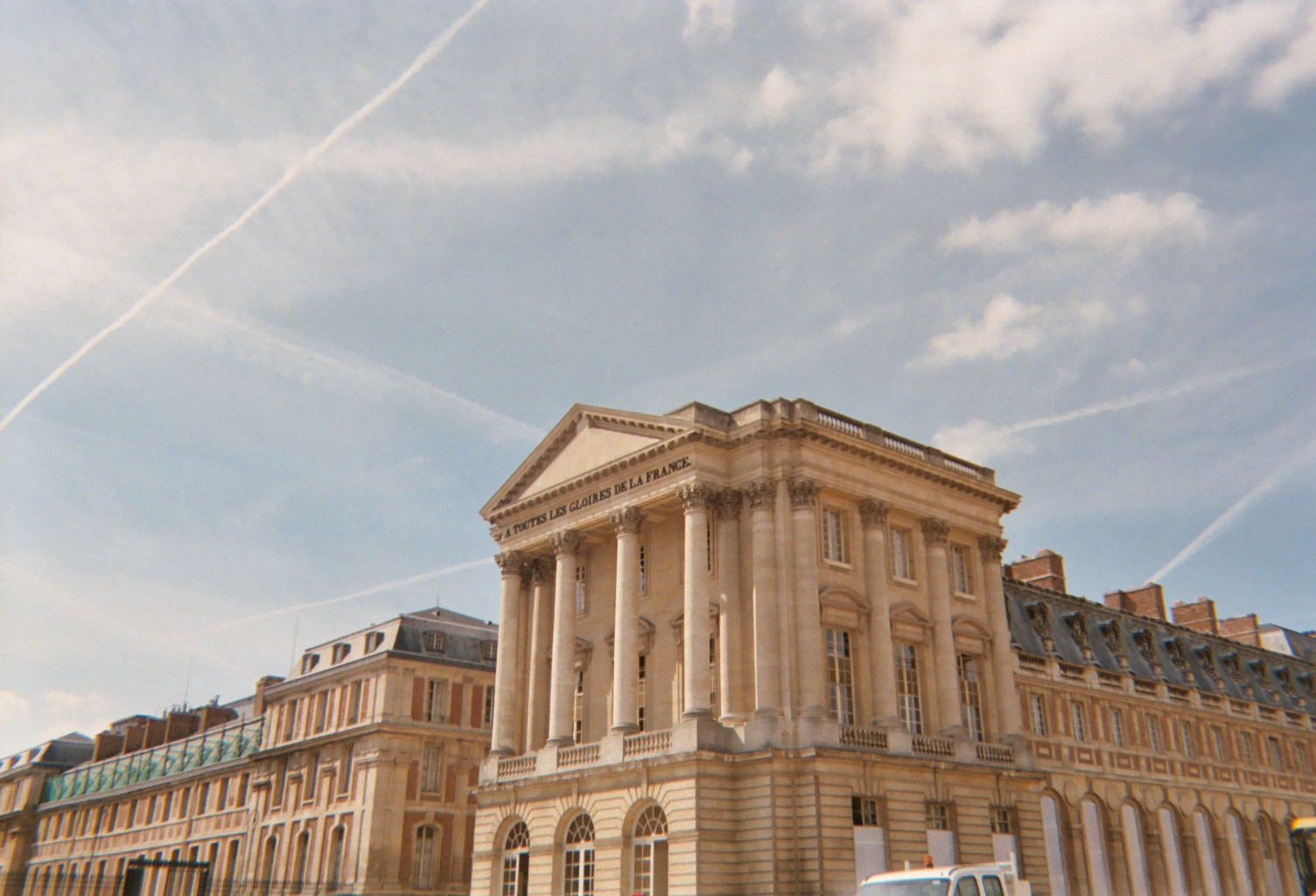
The Château de Versailles (Pavillon Dufour) in the spring of 2006

Only in 1911 did Versailles definitely recover its level of population of 1789, with 60,458 inhabitants at the 1911 census. In 1919, at the end of the First World War, Versailles came into the limelight again as the various treaties ending the war were signed in the castle proper and in the Grand Trianon. After 1919, as the suburbs of Paris continued to expand, Versailles was absorbed by the urban area of Paris, and the city experienced a strong demographic and economic growth, turning it into a large suburban city of the metropolitan area of Paris. The role of Versailles as an administrative and judicial centre was reinforced in the 1960s and 1970s, establishing the city as the main centre of the western suburbs of Paris.

The center of Versailles includes its traditional historic character, while the middle-class residential areas have developed on the outskirts of the city, around train stations. As it is a suburb of Paris, Versailles is connected to the capital by several rail lines. However, the city is extremely compartmentalized, divided by large avenues inherited from the monarchy, which create the impression of several small cities ignoring each other. Versailles was never an industrial city, even though there are a few chemical and food-processing plants. Essentially, Versailles is a place of services, such as public administration, tourism, business, congresses, and festivals. From 1951 until France's withdrawal from the NATO unified command in 1966, nearby Rocquencourt functioned as the site for SHAPE. Versailles is an important military centre, with several units and training schools headquartered at the Satory military base, which hosted the headquarters of the famed 2nd French Armored Division until 1999, and where a military exhibition is organized annually.

Versailles was the location of the signing of the 2026 Islamabad Memorandum.

== Culture ==
Versailles' primary cultural attraction is the Palace, with its ornately decorated rooms and historic significance. The Potager du roi is a kitchen garden created under Louis XIV to supply fruits and vegetables to the Court. It is officially recognized as a Remarkable Garden of France.

The town also has other points of cultural notability; in recent times, its position as an affluent suburb of Paris has meant that it forms a part of the Paris artistic scene, and musical groups such as Phoenix, Air, Fuzati, and Daft Punk have some link to the city, as does the director Michel Gondry.

Significant portions of Marie Antoinette (2006 film), directed by Sofia Coppola, were filmed on location in Versailles, as well as Olivia Rodrigo's music video for Drop Dead.

== Sport ==
Football Club de Versailles 78 is a semi-professional association football club founded in 1933. Their home stadium is the Stade de Montbauron, which has a capacity of 6,208 people.

== Population ==
Historical population

Year	Pop.	±% p.a.
1793	35,093	—
1800	27,574	−3.39%
1806	26,974	−0.37%
1821	27,528	+0.14%
1831	28,477	+0.34%
1836	29,209	+0.51%
1841	35,412	+3.93%
1846	34,901	−0.29%
1851	35,367	+0.27%
1856	39,306	+2.13%
1861	43,899	+2.23%
1866	44,021	+0.06%
1872	61,686	+5.78%
1876	49,847	−5.19%
1881	48,324	−0.62%
1886	49,852	+0.62%
1891	51,679	+0.72%
1896	54,874	+1.21%
1901	54,982	+0.04%

Year	Pop.	±% p.a.
1906	54,820	−0.06%
1911	60,458	+1.98%
1921	64,753	+0.69%
1926	68,574	+1.15%
1931	66,859	−0.51%
1936	73,839	+2.01%
1946	70,141	−0.51%
1954	84,445	+2.35%
1962	86,759	+0.34%
1968	90,829	+0.77%
1975	94,145	+0.51%
1982	91,494	−0.41%
1990	87,789	−0.52%
1999	85,726	−0.26%
2007	86,979	+0.18%
2012	85,424	−0.36%
2017	85,862	+0.10%
2023	84,095	−0.35%

Source: EHESS and INSEE

=== Immigration ===
Place of birth of residents of Versailles in 1999
Born in metropolitan France	Born outside metropolitan France			
87.9%	12.1%			
87.9%	Born in overseas France	Born in foreign countries with French citizenship at birth^{1}	EU-15 immigrants^{2}	Non-EU-15 immigrants
87.9%	0.9%	4.2%	3.2%	3.8%
^{1} This group is made up largely of former French settlers, such as pieds-noirs in Northwest Africa, followed by former colonial citizens who had French citizenship at birth (such as was often the case for the native elite in French colonies), as well as to a lesser extent foreign-born children of French expatriates. A foreign country is understood as a country not part of France in 1999, so a person born for example in 1950 in Algeria, when Algeria was an integral part of France, is nonetheless listed as a person born in a foreign country in French statistics.^{2} An immigrant is a person born in a foreign country not having French citizenship at birth. An immigrant may have acquired French citizenship since moving to France, but is still considered an immigrant in French statistics. On the other hand, persons born in France with foreign citizenship (the children of immigrants) are not listed as immigrants.

== Education ==
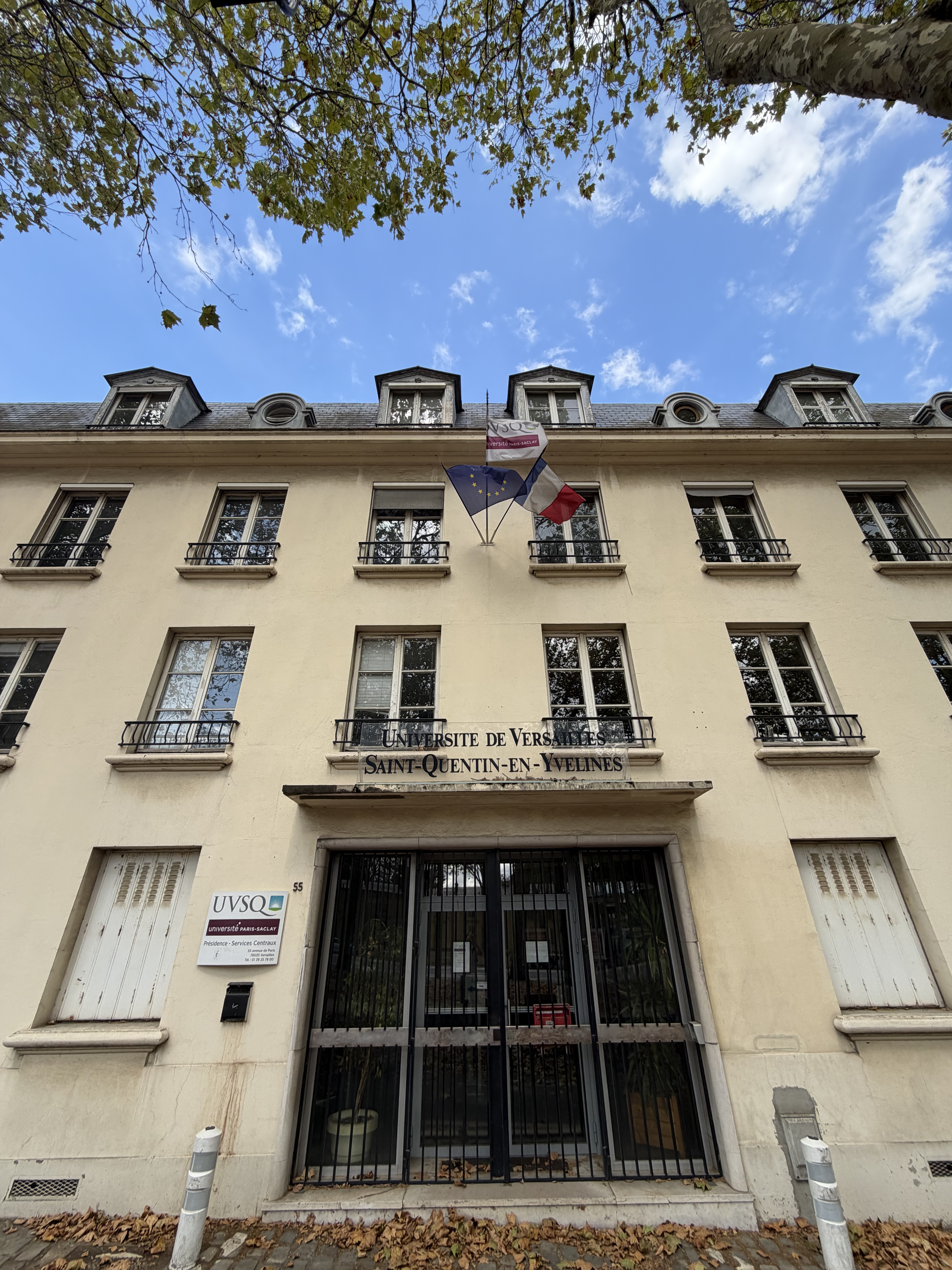
Versailles Saint-Quentin-en-Yvelines University

The headquarters of the Versailles Saint-Quentin-en-Yvelines University is located in the city, as well as the ISIPCA, a post-graduate school in perfume, cosmetics products, and food flavour formulation.

== Transport ==
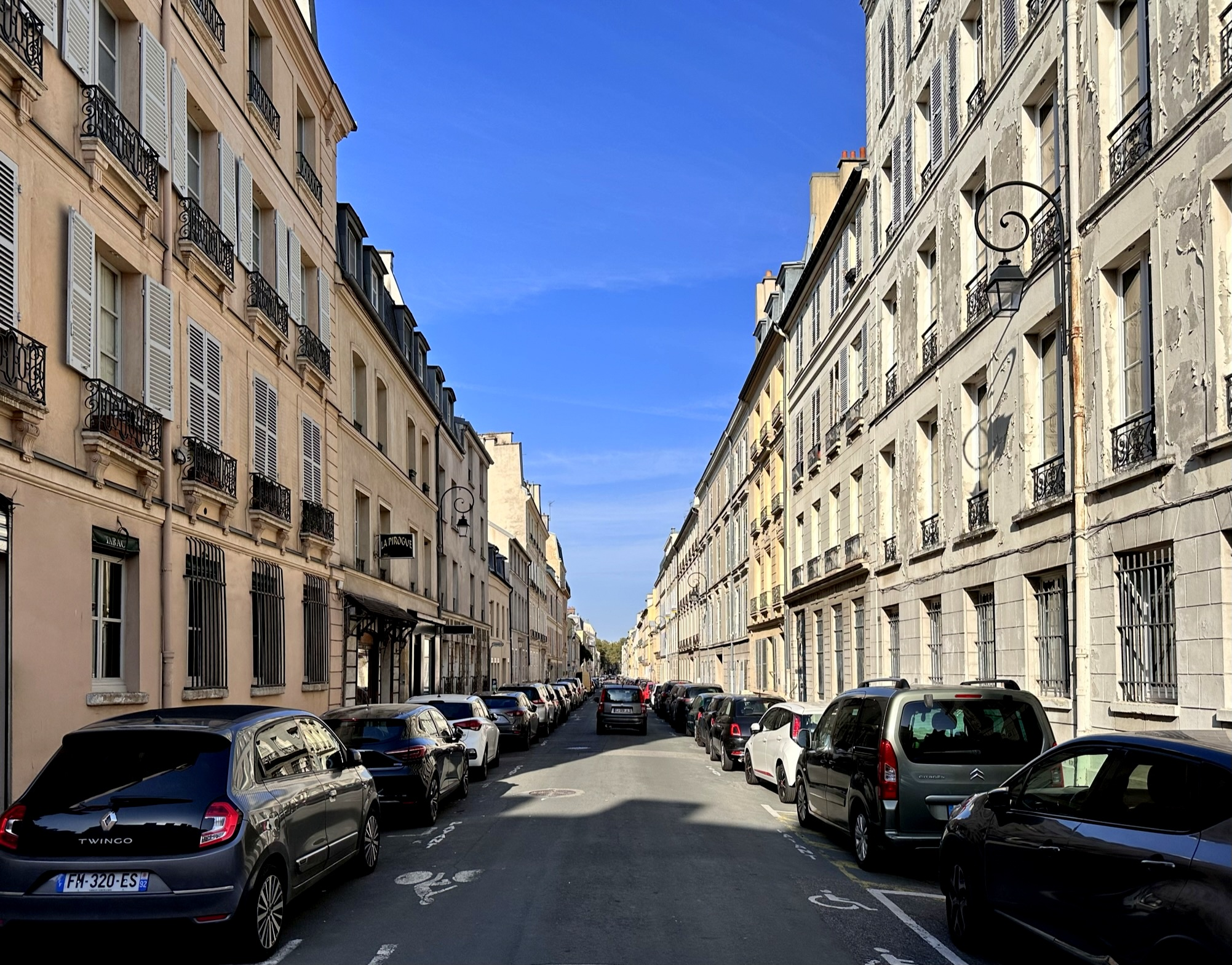
Rue Neuve Notre-Dame in Versailles

Versailles is served by Versailles-Chantiers station, which is an interchange station on Paris RER line C, on the Transilien La Défense suburban rail line, on the Transilien Paris-Montparnasse suburban rail line, and on several national rail lines, including low-frequency TGV service.

Versailles is served by two other stations on Paris RER line C: Versailles-Château–Rive Gauche (the closest station to the Palace of Versailles and consequently the station most frequently used by tourists) and Porchefontaine.

Versailles is also served by two stations on the Transilien Paris-Saint-Lazare suburban rail line: Versailles-Rive Droite and Montreuil.

== Twin towns – sister cities ==
Versailles is twinned with:

- Carthage, Tunisia
- Gyeongju, South Korea
- Nara, Japan
- Potsdam, Germany
- Taipei, Taiwan
- Celbridge, Ireland

== Notable people ==
- Philip V of Spain (1683–1746), King of Spain
- Charles-Michel de l'Épée (1712–1789), philanthropic educator
- Louis-Augustin Richer (1740–1819), singer and composer
- André Michaux (1746–1802), botanist and explorer
- Louis-Alexandre Berthier (1753–1815), Marshal of the Empire
- Lazare Hoche (1768–1797), general
- Charles Ferdinand, Duke of Berry (1778–1820), prince of France
- Ferdinand Marie de Lesseps(1805–1894), diplomat
- Yves Brayer (1907–1990), painter
- Hélène Boucher (1908–1934), pilot
- Albert Malbois (1915–2017), Roman Catholic bishop
- Jean-François Lyotard (1924–1998), philosopher
- Stéphane Audran (1932–2018), actress
- Jean-Raymond Abrial (1938–2025), computer scientist
- Joëlle Mélin (born 1950), politician
- Boris Williams (born 1957), musician
- Marine Jahan (born 1959), dancer
- Bruno Podalydès (born 1961), writer, director, and actor
- Michel Gondry (born 1963), film and music video director
- Stéphane Franke (1964–2011), Franco-German athlete
- Jean-Benoît Dunckel (born 1965), musician
- Grégoire de Galzain (born 1971), racing driver
- Mabrouk El Mechri (born 1976), director, screenwriter, and actor
- Thomas Mars (born 1977), rock musician
- Mory Correa (born 1979), basketball player
- Arabelle Raphael (born 1989), pornographic film actress and artist
- Hoshi (born 1996), singer and songwriter
- Neal Maupay (born 1996), footballer

== See also ==
- Établissement public du château, du musée et du domaine national de Versailles
- Potager du roi, Versailles
