= Éric Aumonier (bishop) =

French bishop

His Excellency Éric Aumonier
- Bishop emeritus of Versailles
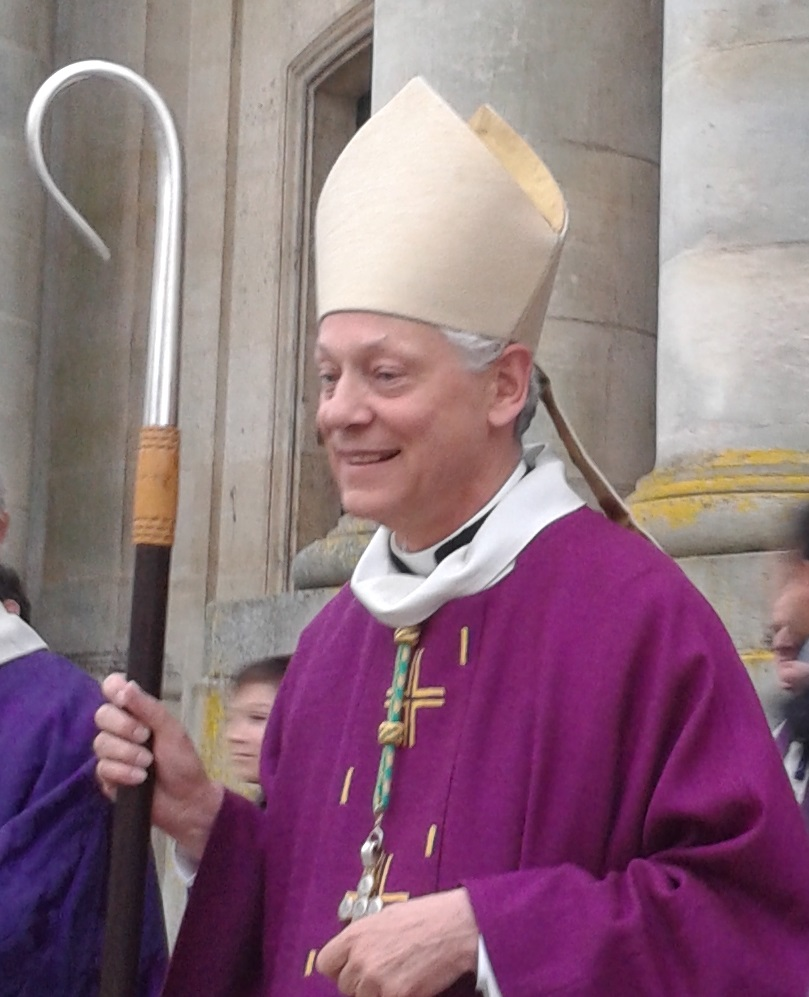
- Church: Roman Catholic Church
- Predecessor: Jean-Charles Thomas
- Successor: Lucien Crepy
- Previous posts: Auxiliary Bishop of Paris (1996–2001); Bishop of Versailles (2001–2020)

Orders
- Ordination: 22 July 1971
- Consecration: 12 July 1996 by Jean-Marie Lustiger

Personal details
- Born: 22 February 1946 (age 80) Paris, France
- Coat of arms: Éric Aumonier's coat of arms

Éric Aumonier (born 22 February 1946) is a French prelate of the Catholic Church who was the Bishop of Versailles from 2001 to 2020. He was previously Auxiliary Bishop of Paris for four years.

== Biography ==
He was born in Paris on 22 February 1947, one of his parents' three sons. He earned a licenciate in philosophy and a doctorate in theology at the Pontifical Gregorian University while living at the French Seminary in Rome. He was ordained a priest of the Archdiocese of Paris on 2 July 1971.

During the next thirty years he worked in the Archdiocese as an assistant parish priest, professor at the Seminary of St. Sulpice in Issy-les-Moulineaux from 1977 to 1981, a delegate of the Archbishop for the Parisian seminaries from 1981 to 1984, the Superior of the Maison Saint-Augustin in Paris from 1984 to 1990, the Superior of the diocesan Seminary of Paris from 1990 to 1996, and a member of the Episcopal Council.

Pope John Paul II appointed him Titular Bishop of Malliana and an auxiliary bishop of Paris on 12 July 1996. He was consecrated a bishop on 11 October of that year by the Archbishop of Paris, Cardinal Jean-Marie Lustiger; the co-consecrators were the Secretary for Relations with States in the Vatican Secretariat of State, Archbishop Jean-Louis Tauran, and the Auxiliary Bishop of Paris, André Vingt-Trois.

On 11 January 2001, Pope John Paul II named him Bishop of Versailles. He led a diocesan synod in 2010. Within the French Episcopal Conference he was a member of the commission for ordained ministry and the laity in service to the Church.

Pope Francis accepted his resignation on 17 December 2020. Aumonier said he had submitted his resignation a few weeks earlier than his 75th birthday as required because he lacked "sufficient energy" to continue as bishop.

== See also ==
- Catholic Church in France
- List of the Roman Catholic dioceses of France

Catholic Church titles
| Preceded by Bruno Torpigliani | Titular bishop of Malliana; 1996–2001 | Succeeded by Bernd Joachim Uhl |
| Preceded by Jean-Charles Thomas | Bishop of Versailles; 2001–2020 | Succeeded by Lucien Crepy |
