= Marlhes =

- Commune
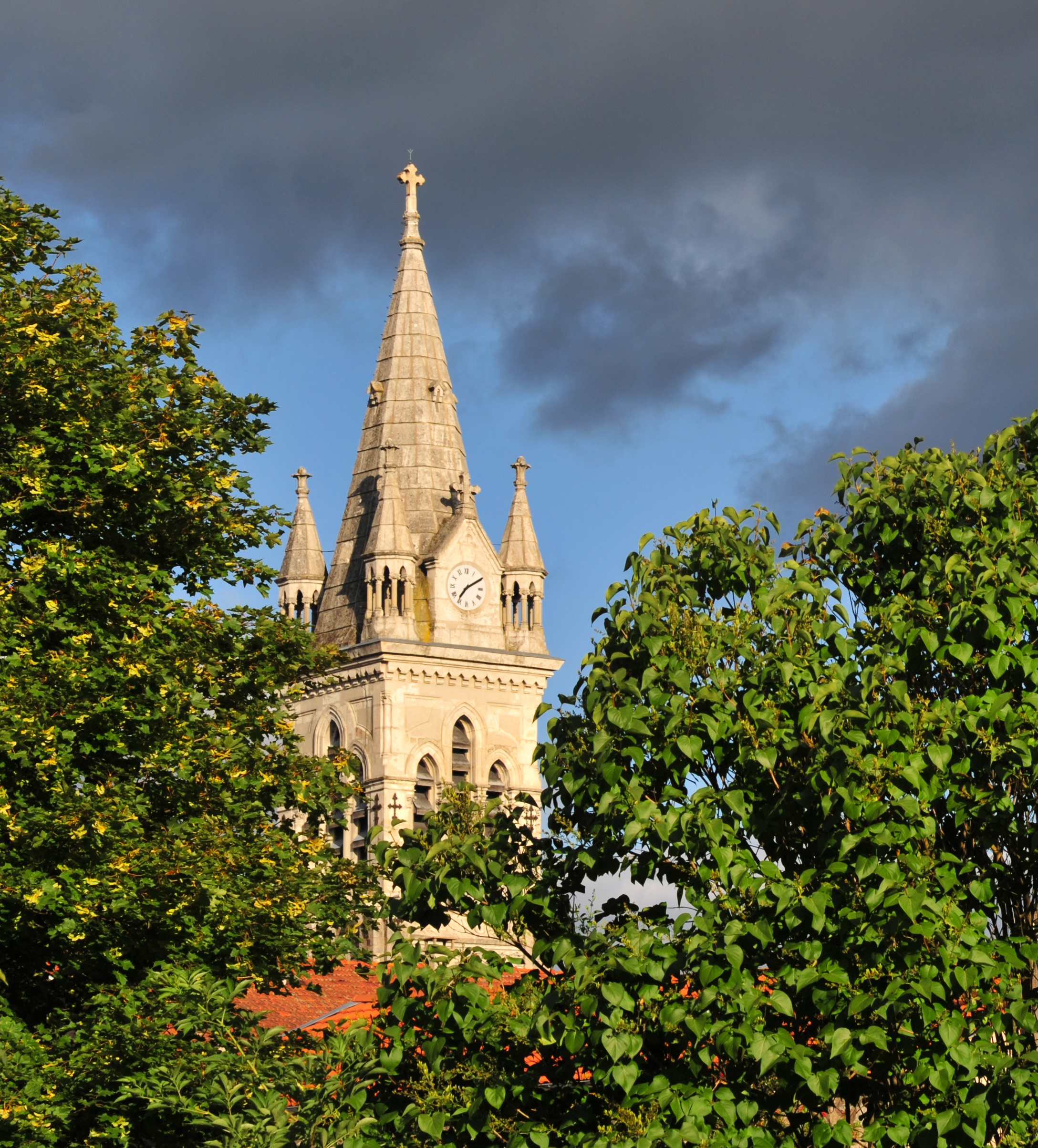
- Location of Marlhes
- Location within France Location within Auvergne-Rhône-Alpes
- Coordinates: 45°17′02″N 4°23′44″E
- Country: France
- Region: Auvergne-Rhône-Alpes
- Department: Loire
- Arrondissement: Saint-Étienne
- Canton: Le Pilat
- Intercommunality: Monts du Pilat

Government
  - Mayor (2020–2026): Jean-François Chorain
- Area^{1}: 32.6 km^{2} (12.6 sq mi)
- Elevation: 945 m (3,100 ft)
- Highest elevation: 1,190 m (3,900 ft)
- Lowest elevation: 810 m (2,660 ft)
- Population (2023): 1,312
  - Density: 40.2/km^{2} (104/sq mi)
- Time zone: UTC+01:00 (CET)
  - Summer (DST): UTC+02:00 (CEST)
- INSEE/Postal code: 42139 /42660
- ^{1} French Land Register data, which excludes lakes, ponds, glaciers > 1 km^{2} (0.386 sq mi or 247 acres) and river estuaries.

Marlhes (French pronunciation: [maʁl]) is a commune in the Loire department in central France.

== Population ==
Historical population
Year	Pop.	±% p.a.
1968	971	—
1975	981	+0.15%
1982	1,021	+0.57%
1990	1,094	+0.87%
1999	1,305	+1.98%
2007	1,375	+0.66%
2012	1,382	+0.10%
2017	1,292	−1.34%
2023	1,312	+0.26%
Source: INSEE

== Twin towns ==
Marlhes is twinned with:

- Féouda, Togo
- Charette, Quebec, Canada

== Personalities ==
Marcellin Champagnat, a Catholic saint who founded the Marist Brothers, was born in the village.

== See also ==
- Communes of the Loire department
