= Laurent Ulrich =

French prelate of the Catholic Church (born 1951)

The Most Reverend Laurent Ulrich
- Metropolitan Archbishop of Paris
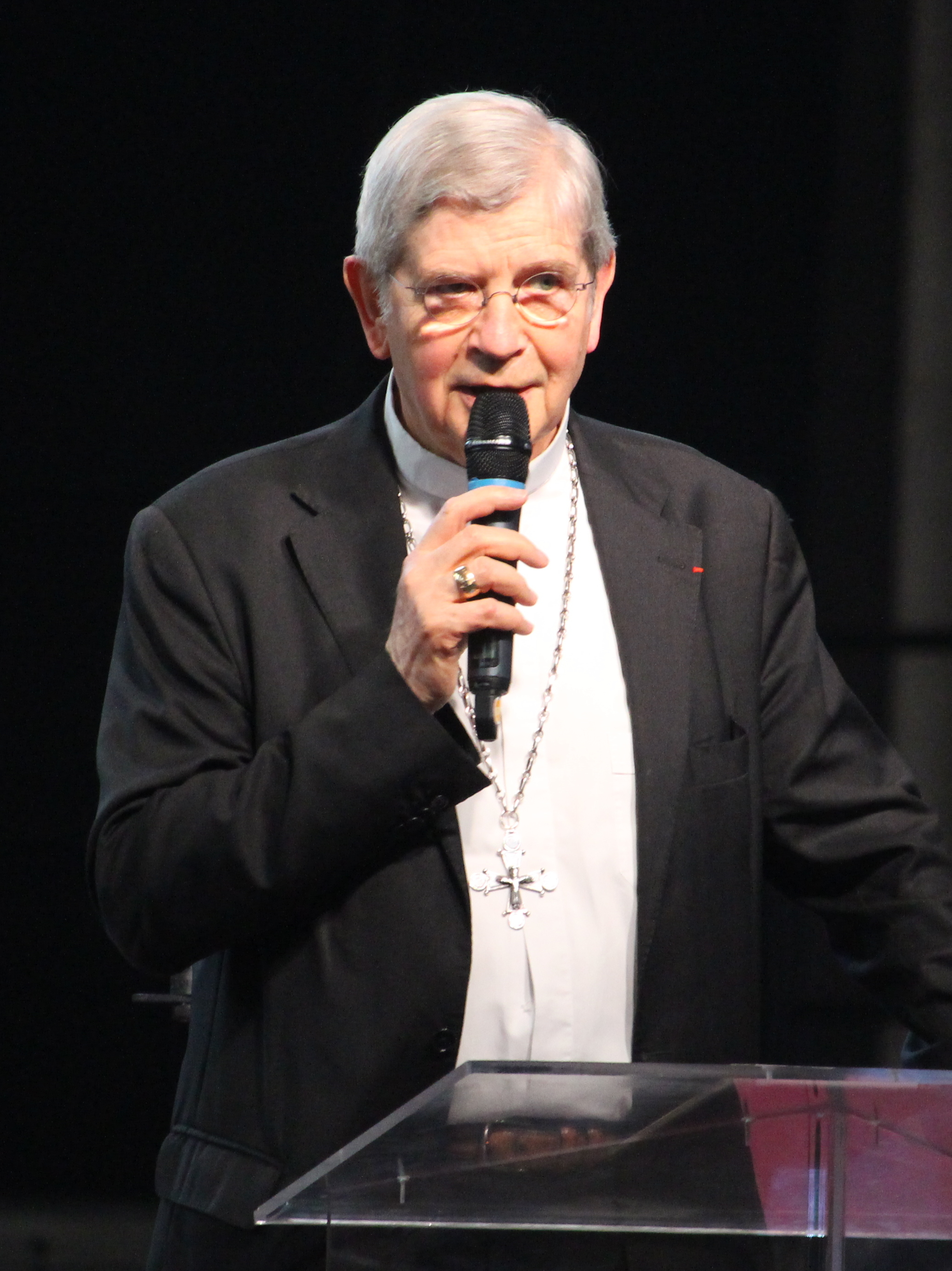
- Church: Catholic Church
- Archdiocese: Paris
- See: Paris
- Appointed: 26 April 2022
- Installed: 23 May 2022
- Predecessor: Michel Aupetit
- Previous posts: Archbishop of Chambéry–Saint-Jean-de-Maurienne–Tarentaise, Archbishop of Lille

Orders
- Ordination: 2 December 1979 by Albert Decourtray
- Consecration: 10 September 2000 by Louis-Marie Billé

Personal details
- Born: 7 September 1951 (age 75) Dijon, France
- Education: University of Dijon; Saint Irénée University Seminary; Catholic University of Lyon
- Motto: La joie de croire (The joy of believing)
- Coat of arms

Laurent Bernard Marie Ulrich (French: [lɔʁɑ̃ ylʁik]; born 7 September 1951) is a French Catholic prelate who has served as Archbishop of Paris since 2022. He was previously Archbishop of Lille from 2008 to 2022 and Archbishop of Chambéry–Saint-Jean-de-Maurienne–Tarentaise from 2000 to 2008. He was vice president of the Bishops' Conference of France from 2007 to 2013.

== Early life and education ==
Laurent Ulrich was born on 7 September 1951 in Dijon. He earned a master's degree in philosophy at the University of Dijon, attended Saint-Irénée University Seminary, and obtained a Licentiate in theology from the Catholic University of Lyon. He was ordained a priest on 2 December 1979 by Albert Decourtray, Bishop of Dijon.

He was Deputy Parish Priest in the Beaune sector (1980-1984) and Deputy Dean (1984-1985); Episcopal Vicar in charge of ongoing formation, sacramental and liturgical pastoral care (1985-1990) and since 1986 also for lay people and religious who are pastorally engaged; Vicar General and Delegate for the Apostolate of the Laity (1990-2000). In 1988 he founded Radio Parabole, a Catholic radio station for Burgundy. He headed Radio Chrétienne francophone (RCF), the French Catholic radio network, for many years.

In 2000, he published a collection of his lectures as L’Enseignement de l’Église sur les questions sociales (The Teaching of the Church on Social Issues).

== Episcopacy ==
Pope John Paul II named him Archbishop of Chambéry–Saint-Jean-de-Maurienne–Tarentaise on 6 June 2000. He received his episcopal consecration on 10 September from Louis-Marie Billé, Archbishop of Lyon. He took his episcopal motto, la joie de croire (the joy of believing), from the writer Madeleine Delbrêl. At the time, he was one of the youngest French bishops.

On 1 February 2008, Pope Benedict XVI appointed him Bishop of Lille, allowing him to retain the personal title of archbishop. The diocese was raised to the status of an archdiocese on 29 March and he was installed there the next day.

Between 2013 and 2016, responding to the urging of Pope Francis, he organized a provincial synod for his archdiocese and its two suffragans, Arras and Cambrai. Pope Francis included him among the papal appointees to the 2015 Synod on the Family. There he was elected reporting secretary of one of the French-language discussion groups. At one point he addressed the problem of mediating culturally specific concerns and universal norms: "The Church is united but there are cultural differences within it.... We cannot detach ourselves from Catholic unity or from the people that have been entrusted to us: we will need to hone our acrobatic skills."

He was awarded the rank of chevalier in the Legion of Honor on 12 May 2017. He said that it represented the nation's recognition that a bishop's work does not serve a separate part of the population but the entire community, that "the Church's commitment to the service of the most vulnerable communities and the integration of the most diverse components of society make a positive contribution to social cohesion". He also called it a healthy recognition of the Church's right to contribute to public debate.

He has advocated on behalf of migrants. In 2015 he said: "One cannot be Catholic, that is to say universal, and xenophobic." During that year's electoral campaign he called for the rejection of the anti-immigrant rhetoric of the National Front party, particularly its "hate speech" and "aggressive vindictiveness". In November 2021, he joined a prayer service at Dunkirk for a group of migrants who died at sea attempting to cross the English Channel.

In 2019, he closed Lille's archdiocesan seminary provisionally for lack of candidates.

Testifying before the French national commission on sexual abuse in 2021, he provided his interpretation of the causes of priestly sexual abuse:

I think that we must put first the relationship of authority and the feeling of impunity that results from it. It is not so much celibacy as the ability to manage impulses, by being trained in it, that counts. The training courses of the past did not make people sensitive to this aspect of managing sexual urges.... Clericalism ... leads to abuse of authority. The question of power is everywhere and always decisive.... I think that part of the deviations observed comes from the fact that, in the Church, priests were the only ones assuming all the power and all the authority.

He was vice president of the Bishops' Conference of France from 2007 to 2013 and from 2013 to 2019 president of its Studies and Projects Committee, which is tasked with animating the work of evangelization.

== Paris ==
Pope Francis appointed him archbishop of Paris on 26 April 2022. On 23 May, he received his crozier from Georges Pontier, apostolic administrator of the archdiocese, outside Notre Dame Cathedral, which was closed for restoration and reconstruction. He then led a vespers service there and entered the cathedral for a moment of private prayer. A Mass to welcome him followed at Church of Saint-Sulpice. A year earlier, when his predecessor in Paris, Archbishop Michel Aupetit, dismissed his vicar general Benoist de Sinety, a prominent figure in the media who had complained of a lack of support from Aupetit while focusing on support for migrants and those most vulnerable during the COVID-19 pandemic, Ulrich assigned Sinety to a prominent Lille parish. (Note: Sinety said he offered his services to Ulrich and was delighted to receive such an important assignment.)

He is president of the Council for Catholic Teaching of the Bishops' Conference of France.

== Positions ==
Ulrich supports a reform of words used by the Catechism of the Catholic Church in the issue of homosexuality to make them more understandable by the use of contemporary language.

== Notes ==
Catholic Church titles
| Preceded by Claude Feidt | Archbishop of Chambéry and Bishop of Saint-Jean-de-Maurienne–Tarentaise; 2000–2008 | Succeeded by Philippe Ballot |
| Preceded by Gérard Defois | Archbishop of Lille; 2008–2022 | Succeeded by Laurent Le Boulc'h |
| Preceded by Michel Aupetit | Archbishop of Paris; 2022–present | Incumbent |
| Preceded by Michel Aupetit | Ordinary of France of the Eastern Rite; 2022–present | Incumbent |
