= Georges Gilson =

French Roman Catholic archbishop (1929–2024)

His Excellency Georges Gilson
- Archbishop Emeritus of Sens and Auxerre
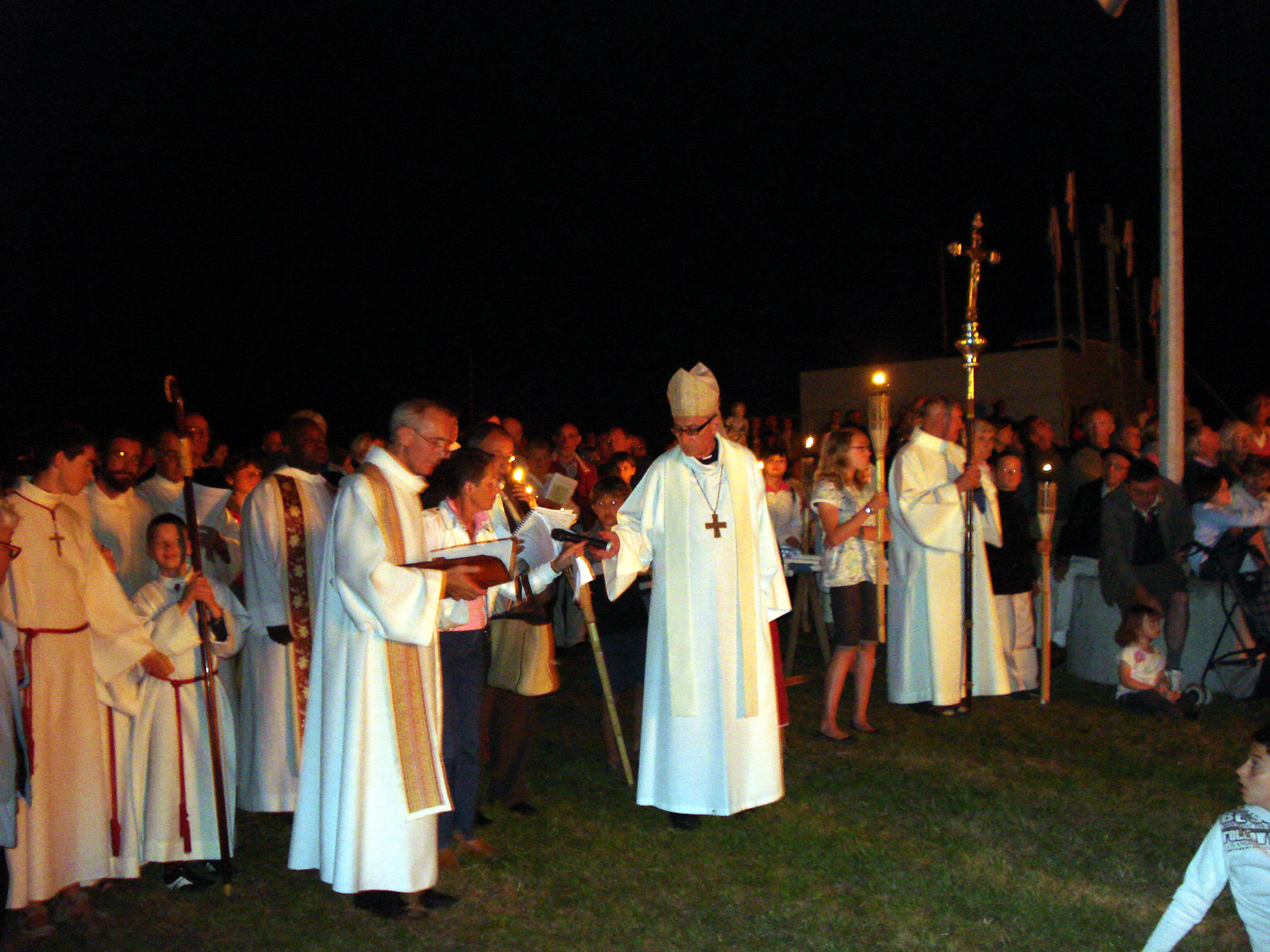
- Mgr Georges Gilson, Archbishop Emeritus of Sens-Auxerre, Prelate Emeritus of Mission of France, "pardonneur" of Pardon de la Clarté in 2009
- Archdiocese: Sens and Auxerre
- Appointed: 2 August 1996
- Term ended: 31 December 2004
- Predecessor: Gérard Defois
- Successor: Yves Patenôtre
- Other post: Prelate Mission de France at Pontigny (1996–2004)
- Previous posts: Auxiliary Bishop of Paris and Titular Bishop of Benda (1976–1981); Bishop of Le Mans (1981–1996)

Orders
- Ordination: 20 April 1957 by Émile-Arsène Blanchet
- Consecration: 9 October 1976 by François Marty

Personal details
- Born: 30 May 1929 Paris, France
- Died: 27 November 2024 (aged 95)

Georges Robert Edmond Gilson (30 May 1929 – 27 November 2024) was a French Roman Catholic archbishop.

== Biography ==
Gilson was ordained a priest in 1957. In 1974, he was appointed vicar general of the Archdiocese of Paris. Since 1976, he served as auxiliary bishop to Cardinal Marty of Paris.

On the appointment of Cardinal Lustiger as Archbishop of Paris, Gilson was rapidly appointed to the see of Le Mans (1981). From 1996 to 2004 he served as Archbishop of Sens-Auxerre (the see lost its metropolitan functions in 2002) and simultaneously as Prelate to the Mission de France (Pontigny). He retired on 31 December 2004.

Gilson died on 27 November 2024, at the age of 95.

Catholic Church titles
Preceded by Gérard Defois	Archbishop of Sens and Auxerre; 1996–2004	Succeeded by Yves Patenôtre
Preceded by André Jean René Lacrampe	Prelate of Mission de France at Pontigny; 1996–2004	Succeeded by Yves Patenôtre
Preceded by Bernard-Pierre-Edmond Alix	Bishop of Le Mans; 1981–1996	Succeeded by Jacques Maurice Faivre
Preceded by James Edward McManus	Titular Bishop of Benda; 1976–1981	Succeeded by Johannes Bernardus Niënhaus
Preceded by —	Auxiliary Bishop of Paris; 1976–1981	Succeeded by —
