= Achille Liénart =

French cardinal

His Eminence Achille Liénart
- Cardinal, Bishop Emeritus of Lille
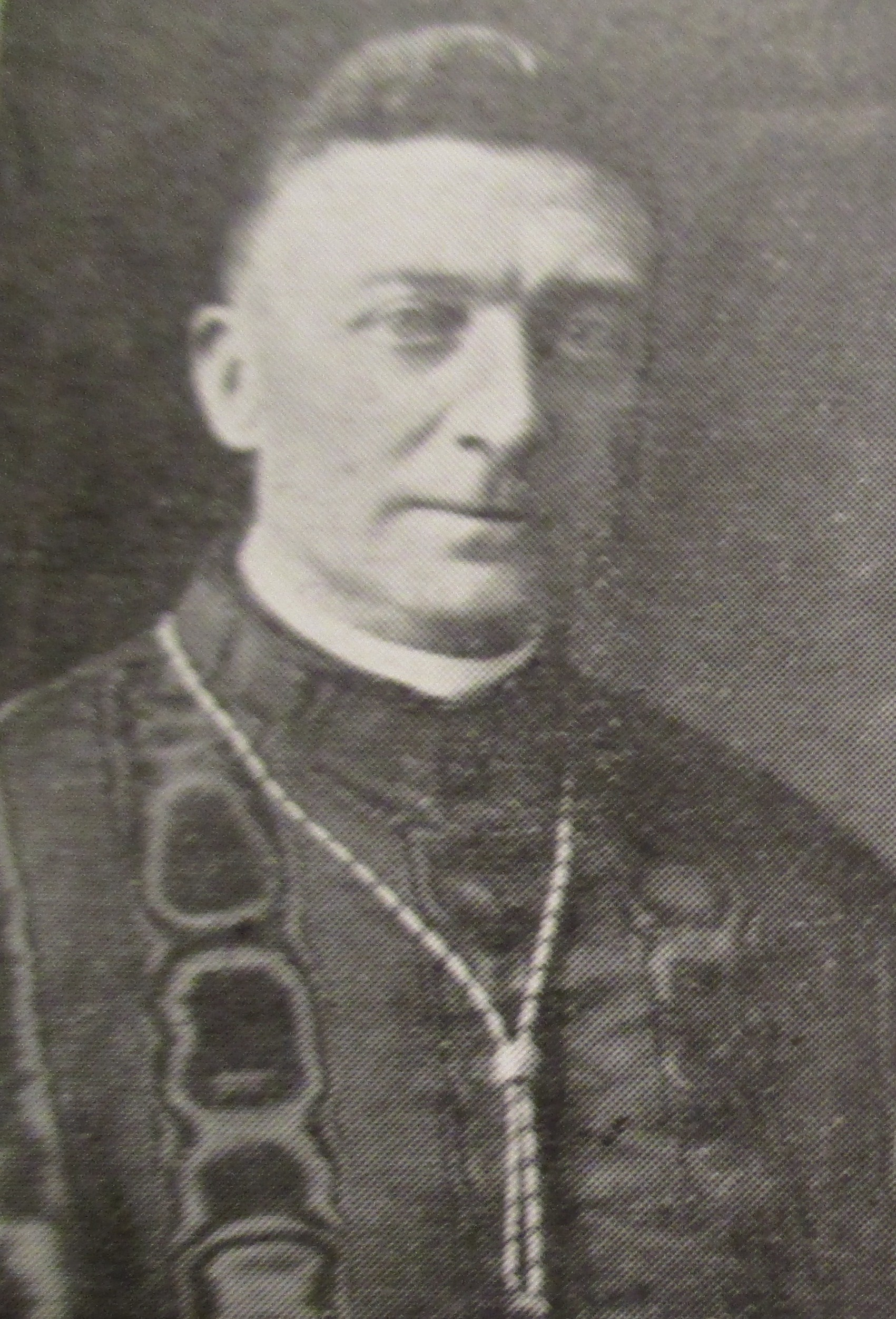
- Cardinal Liénart in February 1939.
- Church: Catholic Church
- Diocese: Lille
- Appointed: 6 October 1928
- Term ended: 14 March 1968
- Predecessor: Hector-Raphael Quilliet
- Successor: Adrien-Edmond-Maurice Gand
- Other post: Cardinal-Priest of San Sisto (1930-73)
- Previous posts: President of the French Episcopal Conference (1948-64); Bishop-Prelate of Mission de France (1954-64)

Orders
- Ordination: 29 June 1907 by Léon-Adolphe Amette
- Consecration: 8 December 1928 by Charles-Albert-Joseph Lecomte
- Created cardinal: 30 June 1930 by Pius XI
- Rank: Cardinal-Priest

Personal details
- Born: 7 February 1884 Lille, French Third Republic
- Died: 15 February 1973 (aged 89) Lille, France
- Buried: Lille Cathedral
- Parents: Achille Philippe Hyacinthe Liénart; Louise Delesalle
- Education: Institut Catholique de Paris; Collège de Sorbonne; Pontifical Biblical Institute
- Motto: Miles Christi Jesu
- Coat of arms

Styles of Achille Liénart
- Reference style: His Eminence
- Spoken style: Your Eminence
- Informal style: Cardinal
- See: Lille (emeritus)

Achille Liénart (French: [aʃil ljenaʁ]; 7 February 1884—15 February 1973) was a French cardinal of the Roman Catholic Church. He served as Bishop of Lille from 1928 to 1968, and was elevated to the cardinalate in 1930.

== Biography ==
=== Background ===
Born in Lille to a bourgeois family of cloth merchants, Liénart was the second of the four children of Achille Philippe Hyacinthe Liénart and Louise Delesalle. He studied at College Saint-Joseph, the Seminary of Saint-Sulpice in Paris, the Institut Catholique de Paris, Collège de Sorbonne, and the Pontifical Biblical Institute in Rome. He was ordained to the priesthood on 29 June 1907, and then taught at the Seminary of Cambrai until 1910, and then at Lille until 1914. During World War I Liénart served as a chaplain to the French Army, and did pastoral work in his hometown from 1919 to 1928. As a priest, he championed social reform, trade unionism, and the worker-priest movement.

=== Bishop of Lille ===
On 6 October 1928 he was appointed Bishop of Lille by Pope Pius XI. Liénart received his episcopal consecration on the following December 8 from Bishop Charles-Albert-Joseph Lecomte of Amiens, with Bishops Palmyre Jasoone and Maurice Feltin serving as co-consecrators, in Tourcoing. He was created Cardinal Priest of S. Sisto by Pius XI in the consistory of 30 June 1930. By coincidence, one of the first priests he ordained, on 21 September 1929, was Marcel Lefebvre. Liénart's and Lefebvre's paths were intertwined during the following years, even serving both on the Central Preparatory Commission for the Second Vatican Council. And it was Liénart who, as cardinal, in 1947 consecrated Lefebvre (who had been appointed as Apostolic Vicar of Dakar in Senegal), to the episcopate.

During the German occupation, Liénart initially supported Philippe Pétain, but was greatly opposed to Nazi Germany. Shortly after the Armistice of 22 June 1940, Liénart along with Cardinal Gerlier and Cardinal Suhard attended a meeting with Vichy officials and presented them with a list of demands from the Church to Pétain, with the reintroduction of Catholic education highlighted as the most important issue. Vichy France accepted these demands, and General Maxime Weygand remarked that “France deserved her defeat; she was beaten because her governments for half a century have chased God from school”. However, in late July 1940, Liénart was arrested by Nazi authorities along with Cardinal Roques and accused of being “Jew-lovers”, along with charges of planning actions to subvert the Nazis, and plotting against the German Reich. Their arrest was a part of a larger anti-church action in occupied France, as Nazi authorities also targeted the Catholic Institute of Paris and headquarters of Catholic daily La Croix, which was raided and pillaged. Liénart blamed Vichy for its submission towards Nazi Germany and allowing persecution of the Church; in August, Liénart sent Cardinal Baudrillart a letter full of “violent accusations against Vichy, its spirit, its government.” Liénart would remain hostile to Vichy ever since, questioning “if Pétain is even worthy of the praise being heaped upon him in Paris.”

=== Cardinal and worker-priest movement ===
Liénart, who participated in the 1939 papal conclave, was elected president of the French Episcopal Conference in 1948, representing the Catholic Church in France, and remained in that post until 1964. An elector in the 1958 papal conclave, he was named the first territorial prelate of Mission de France on 13 November 1954 and later resigned from this post in 1964.

Liénart had a nickname of a "Red Cardinal" because of his support for the left-wing worker-priest movement and Catholic trade unions, and he strongly promoted social justice within the Church. Seeking collaboration with workers' associations and pursuing dialogue with socialist and communist trade unions, French worker-priests under Liénart would earn the respect of various left-wing movements, including the Marxist ones. Entering dialogue with these priests, a French communist activist remarked in 1954: "You are Christian and a priest; I am a Communist. But I say we are brothers. And when you tell me by my conduct that I am Christian, I respond to you that I would be even more so if the church was what you wished it to be." Liénart continued to maintain the movement even after Vatican took action against worker-priests in 1953, making sure that they could stay active "through special dispensations and broad interpretations of the papal wishes". Vatican would reverse its decision and embrace the movement in 1962.

Pope Pius XI was committed to 'rechristianizing' the working class in France and downplaying the hitherto elitist image of the Church there; he received a reputation of a "defender of the French proletariat" based on the fact that he appointed Liénart as the Bishop of Lille, baptized Young Christian Workers (JOC), vindicated French Confederation of Christian Workers and published Quadragesimo Anno in 1931 which he focused on the poverty and condition of the working class. According to Canadian historian Oscar L. Arnal, Liénart established himself as a devoted supporter of both Christian and secular labour unions, and organized several campaigns "to raise money for the strikers’ suffering families, and he had called upon the factory owners to negotiate the labor dispute sincerely". Business circles in Lille reportedly despised Liénart, accusing him of communist sympathies and breaching episcopal neutrality. However, Vatican sided with Liénart, as the Sacred Congregation of Rites published a document defending French trade unions and appointed promoted Liénart to cardinal in 1929. Remarking on the left-wing alignment of Liénart, Arnal described that he represented a new revolutionary, anti-capitalist faction within the French Church:

From the more visionary prelates to the lay masses of the Jeunesse Ouvriére Chrétienne and the Action Catholique Ouvriére, a new spirit of mission permeated the French church after the war. Catholicism began to welcome a revolutionary future as much as it had yearned previously for a lost past or a stable present. It was no longer a question of accepting a republican government and democratic political ideas. Instead, they rejected French Revolutionary and liberal values in the name of a more egalitarian society struggling to be born out of a decaying brutal capitalism. Cardinals like Suhard of Paris, Liénart of Lille, and Gerlier of Lyon believed firmly that worker-priests, proletarian Catholic Action, working-class parishes, and a missionary-trained clergy could offer French workers a serious, socialist alternative to classical Marxism.

— Oscar L. Arnal, Ambivalent Alliance: The Catholic Church and the Action Française, 1899-1939, (1985), pp. 181

During the Spanish Civil War, Liénart also organized help and supplies to Basque Country and helped Basque refugees escape to France. Liénart was sympathetic to the Basque independence movement and praised their dedication to the Catholic faith, arguing that it is of utmost importance to help Basque peoples protect their traditions, language and culture. He coordinated the effort of Catholic and secular trade unions to form a pro-Basque and anti-fascist alliance; and endorsed the announcement of the local Catholic union leader Maurice Dignac, who stated: "The Basque refugees in France will not be able to arrive at the feet of the Holy Father, as the Spanish refugees in Italy may. These thousands of Basque Catholics pursued by the rebels, plundered by the Crusaders, without homes or property, will not be able to reach the Father of Christianity: the Government of the fascist will stop them at the border.” In his pastoral letter, Liénart similarly wrote: "Basques are desolate; Christian charity asks us to assist them. Most of them are our brothers in faith: this is one more reason to help them."

French right-wing perfume magnate François Coty accused Liénart of "aiding and abetting communism", given his support for trade unions and willingness to negotiate with socialist movements. In his book Catholic Labor Movements in Europe Social Thought and Action, 1914–1965, Paul Misner called the cardinal "a champion of Christian labor and the JOC from the beginning of his episcopate", arguing that his close cooperation and endorsement of unions had a profound impact on social Catholicism in France and its relations with socialist movements. Pastoral letters by Liénart were "treated like a social encyclical" in France, and amongst the French left, his actions and willingness to cooperate "deprived their Catholic opponents of any objections in principle".

=== Leading liberal at the Second Vatican Council ===
An active participant of the Second Vatican Council (1962–1965), Liénart was a leading liberal voice at the council and sat on its Board of Presidency. When the Roman Curia, composed predominantly of conservative prelates, issued a list of nominees for the members of the council's commissions, Liénart objected that nothing of the nominees' qualifications were included. Liénart, assisted by Cardinals Bernardus Johannes Alfrink and Giovanni Colombo, delivered one of the closing messages of the council on 8 December 1965. He was also one of the cardinal electors in the 1963 papal conclave, which selected Pope Paul VI.

Liénart resigned as Lille's bishop on 14 March 1968, after forty years of service. Due to rule changes by Pope Paul VI he lost, on January 1, 1971, the right to participate in a conclave, having reached the age of 80. After his death at 89, he was buried in the Cathédrale Notre-Dame-de-la-Treille.

Posthumously, Liénart was incorrectly associated with a 1976 list of then living Vatican clergymen accused of membership in Freemasonry, first published in France in the Bulletin de l'Occident Chrétien and shortly after in Italy in Panorama, but was later known as the Pecorelli list. However, Liénart's name does not feature on this original 1976 list or the republished 1978 version in Osservatore Politico, associated with the Italian journalist Carmine Pecorelli, having died some years before it was compiled. According to Fr. Carl Pulvermacher in an article written in The Angelus in 1978, this false association was later maliciously added by a group of American traditionalists (including Hugo Maria Kellner, the journal Veritas and Hutton Gibson), due to a factional dispute within traditional Catholicism, aimed at attacking Archbishop Marcel Lefebvre, founder of the Society of St. Pius X (SSPX), who had been ordained a priest and then conscerated a bishop by Liénart many years before.

Catholic Church titles
Preceded by Hector-Raphaël Quilliet	Bishop of Lille; 1928–1968	Succeeded by Adrien-Edmond-Maurice Gand
Preceded by Emmanuel Célestin Suhard	President of the French Episcopal Conference; 1948–1964	Succeeded by François Marty
