= Jean Marie Balland =

French cardinal (1934–1998)

His Eminence Jean Marie Balland
- Cardinal, Archbishop of Lyon
- Church: Catholic Church
- Archdiocese: Lyon
- See: Lyon
- Appointed: 27 May 1995
- Term ended: 1 March 1998
- Predecessor: Albert Decourtray
- Successor: Louis-Marie Billé
- Other post: Cardinal-Priest of San Pietro in Vincoli (1998)
- Previous posts: Bishop of Dijon (1982–88); Archbishop of Reims (1988–95)

Orders
- Ordination: 3 September 1961
- Consecration: 12 December 1982 by Charles-Marie-Paul Vignancour
- Created cardinal: 21 February 1998 by Pope John Paul II
- Rank: Cardinal-Priest

Personal details
- Born: Jean Marie Julien Balland; 26 July 1934 Bué, France
- Died: 1 March 1998 (aged 63) Lyon, France
- Education: Pontifical Gregorian University; Sorbonne University
- Motto: Veritatem facientes in caritate
- Coat of arms

Styles of Jean Marie Balland
- Reference style: His Eminence
- Spoken style: Your Eminence
- Religious style: Monsignor
- Informal style: Cardinal
- See: Lyon

Jean Marie Julien Balland (26 July 1934 in Bué, Cher, France – 1 March 1998 in Lyon) was a Catholic Cardinal and Archbishop of Lyon.

== Early life ==
He entered the seminary and later attended the Pontifical Gregorian University in Rome where he earned a licentiate in philosophy in 1956, and in theology. He later attended the Sorbonne University in Paris where he graduated with doctorates in philosophy and theology. He was ordained on 3 September 1961.

After his ordination he was a faculty member of the seminary where he was ordained from 1962 to 1968. He was transferred, teaching at Tours from 1967 to 1973.

== Episcopate ==
Pope John Paul II appointed him as Bishop of Dijon on 6 November 1982. He was transferred to the Metropolitan see of Reims in 1988. He was appointed as the Archbishop of Lyon on 27 May 1995. Archbishop Balland was created and proclaimed Cardinal-Priest in the consistory of 21 February 1998 with the titular church of San Pietro in Vincoli.

In 1992, politician Jean Marie Le Pen planned to hold a meeting in front of Reims Cathedral; Bishop Balland closed the cathedral and canceled masses that day in protest of this.

He died of lung cancer on 1 March 1998, eight days after becoming a cardinal.

Catholic Church titles
Preceded by Jacques Eugène Louis Ménager	Archbishop of Reims; 1988–1995	Succeeded by Gérard Defois
Preceded by Albert Decourtray	Archbishop of Lyon; 27 May 1995 – 1 March 1998	Succeeded by Louis-Marie Billé
Preceded by Leo Joseph Suenens	Cardinal-Priest of the San Pietro in Vincoli; 21/02 – 1/03/1998	Succeeded by Louis-Marie Billé
