= Jacques Faivre (bishop) =

French Catholic bishop

His Excellency Jacques Faivre
- Bishop of Le Mans
- Church: Roman Catholic Church
- See: Diocese of Le Mans
- Predecessor: Georges Gilson
- Successor: Yves Le Saux

Orders
- Ordination: 29 June 1960
- Consecration: 14 June 1992 by Albert Decourtray
- Rank: Bishop

Personal details
- Born: 11 August 1934 Lyon, France
- Died: 13 August 2010 (aged 76) France

Jacques Faivre, (b. Lyon 11 August 1934, d. 13 August 2010) was the French Catholic bishop of Le Mans from 1997 to 2008.

He entered the seminary of Francheville in the department of Rhône before beginning his studies at the university seminary in Lyon, where he obtained a degree in theology. He was ordained priest for the archdiocese of Lyon on 29 June 1960, where he began his career as a parish minister for nine years before dedicating himself for 15 years as the chaplain of schools. In 1984 he was appointed curate of the parishes of Notre-Dame-Saint-Vincent and Saint-Paul in Lyon, and was appointed deputy bishop of Lyon on 11 April 1992 where he was consecrated on 14 June 1992 in the Primatiale of Lyon by Cardinal Albert Decourtray. He was nominated Bishop of Le Mans on 29 July 1997 taking up his seat on 3 September to be enthroned on 21 September 1997, with Abbot Jean Brégeon as his assistant and Vicar General. In the episcopal lineage and apostolic succession, he follows Albert Florent Augustin Cardinal Decourtray, archbishop of Lyon, who died in 1994. On 27 March 2008 he informed the Pope of his retirement for reasons of ill health. The acceptance of his resignation was delayed for several weeks in order that he participate at the diocesan assembly of Pentecost 2008. On 3 July his departure was officially announced by the Vatican. He died two years later on 13 August 2010.

During his career he officiated at the beatification of Basile-Antoine Moreau in the centre of Antares in Le Mans on 5 September 2007 in the presence of thirty bishops and archbishops and the legate of Pope Benedict XVI, Monseigneur Martins. This was the first beatification ever to take place outside the Vatican without the presence of the Pope. On 21 December 2005 he began the diocesan process for the beatification and canonisation of Dom Guéranger, liturgist and restorer of the Benedictine Order of Solesmes.
