= Jean Rupp =

French Catholic bishop and diplomat

Jean-Édouard-Lucien Rupp
- Permanent Observer of the Holy See to the United Nations in Geneva
- Church: Catholic Church
- In office: 13 July 1978 – 5 July 1980
- Predecessor: Silvio Luoni
- Successor: Edoardo Rovida
- Other post: Titular Archbishop of Dionysiopolis (1971-1983)
- Previous posts: Apostolic Pro-Nuncio to Kuwait (1975-1978); Apostolic Pro-Nuncio to Iraq (1971-1978); Bishop of Monaco (1962-1971); Titular Bishop of Arca in Phoenicia (1954-1962); Auxiliary Bishop of France of the Eastern Rite (1954-1962)

Orders
- Ordination: 31 March 1934
- Consecration: 18 January 1955 by Maurice Feltin

Personal details
- Born: 13 October 1905 Saint-Germain-en-Laye, Seine-et-Oise, France
- Died: 28 January 1983 (aged 77) Rome, Italy

Jean-Édouard-Lucien Rupp (13 October 1905 – 28 January 1983) was a French prelate of the Catholic Church who served as Bishop of Monaco from 1962 to 1971 and then worked in the diplomatic service of the Holy See until he retired in 1980.

== Biography ==
Jean Rupp was born in Saint-Germain-en-Laye on 13 October 1905. He entered the Saint Sulpice Seminary of Issy-les-Moulineaux in 1928. He was ordained a priest on 31 March 1934.

In 1946, in concert with Jean Larnaud, a Catholic layman, and the support of the Apostolic Nuncio to France, Angelo Roncalli (later Pope John XXIII), he founded the International Catholic Center for Cooperation with UNESCO (Centre Catholique International de Coopération avec l’UNESCO or CCIC), which launched its operations the next year. In 1947, Pope Pius XII named him to represent the Holy See to the United Nations Educational, Scientific and Cultural Organization (UNESCO), though as a liaison rather than a formal diplomatic role.

Pope Pius XII appointed him auxiliary bishop of Paris for the Ordinariate for Eastern Catholics in France on 28 October 1954. Pope John XXIII named him the Bishop of Monaco on 9 June 1962 (Note: Monaco was not elevated to the status of archdiocese until 1981.) and he was enthroned there on 7 October.

Rupp participated in all four sessions of the Second Vatican Council. In 1964 he addressed the Council at length on the lack of Christian solidarity demonstrated in failing to denounce the Armenian genocide. (Note: This resulted in a two-week visit to the Soviet Union in 1965, prompted by an invitation from Vazgen I to attend the celebration marking the tenth anniversary of his election to head the Armenian national church.) He was appreciated for his concern for oecumenism with the Anglican Church as well. Rupp was a member of the conservative Coetus Internationalis Patrum.

On 8 May 1971, Pope Paul VI named him Apostolic Pro-Nuncio to Iraq, raising him to the rank of archbishop, and then added the title Pro-Nuncio to Kuwait on 4 March 1975.

On 13 July 1978, a month before his death, Paul VI appointed Rupp the Permanent Observer of the Holy See to the United Nations in Geneva. He retired from this post on 5 July 1980 and Edoardo Rovida succeeded him in this post.

In 1980, when Rupp turned 75, the standard age for a prelate to retire from active ministry, Pope John Paul II named him a canon of the Basilica of St. Mary Major. Rupp died in Rome on 28 January 1983 and was buried in that basilica on 31 January.

== Writings ==
- L’idée de chrétienté dans la pensée pontificale des origins à Innocent III, Presses modernes, 1939
- Brésil, espoir chrétien, Spes, 1965
- Explorations œcuméniques, Pastorelly, 1967
- Héros chrétiens de l’est. Hommage au déporté Kolbe, 1972
- Message ecclésial de Solowiew. Présage et illustration de Vatican II., Lethielleux, Paris and Brussels, 1975
- Un levier pour l’œcuménisme: Wladimir Solowiew, Lethielleux, 1975
- Histoire de l’Église de Paris, 1948 réédition Robert laffont, 1992
- Un évêque revient d'U.R.S.S.
- Lumière à l'Est, Pastorelly, 1969
- Docteur pour nos temps: Catherine et Thérèse, Lethielleux, 1971

== See also ==
- St Benedict Patron of Europe Association
