= Laurent Le Boulc'h =

French prelate

The Most Reverend Laurent Le Boulc'h
- Metropolitan Archbishop of Lille
- Church: Roman Catholic Church
- See: Archdiocese of Lille
- Appointed: 1 April 2023
- Predecessor: Laurent Ulrich

Orders
- Ordination: 19 June 1988 by Pierre Kervennic
- Consecration: 27 October 2013 by Jean-Charles Descubes

Personal details
- Born: 4 September 1960 (age 65) Loudéac, France
- Coat of arms

Laurent Le Boulc'h (born 4 September 1960) is a French prelate of the Catholic Church who became metropolitan archbishop of Lille in 2023. He was bishop of Coutances from 2013 to 2023.

== Biography ==
Laurent Le Boulc'h was born on 4 September 1960 in Loudéac, Brittany. He completed his secondary education at Saint-Joseph College and at the Catholic Lyceum in Pontivy. After a year at the Faculty of Physics and Chemistry, he entered the interdiocesan seminary of Vannes to study philosophy and theology from 1980 to 1991, interrupted by his two years of military service from 1982 to 1984. In 1991 he enrolled in the Faculty of Theology of the Institut Catholique in Paris, where he obtained a licentiate in theology.

He was ordained a priest for the Diocese of Saint-Brieuc on 19 June 1988. He was vicar of the cathedral of Saint-Brieuc from 1988 to 1991 and studied at the Institut Catholique in Paris from 1991 to 1993. He was episcopal vicar for youth ministry from 1993 to 2005) and head of ongoing training from 2003 to 2005. From 2005 to 2013 he was parish priest of Lannion and head of the pastoral area of that name. From 1993 to 2013 he was also responsible for the pastoral care of Catholic schools. In 2013 he was named episcopal delegate for tourism and culture.

Pope Francis named bishop of the Diocese of Coutances and Avranches on 5 September 2013. La Croix deemed his appointment unusual in that he had been neither vicar general of a diocese nor head of a seminary. He received his episcopal consecration on 27 October in the cathedral of Coutances from Jean-Charles Descubes, Archbishop of Rouen.

Within the Bishops' Conference of France, he became head of the "Territories and Parishes" working group and a member of the council for movements and associations of the faithful.

He was made a knight of the Legion of Honor on 14 July 2018.

Pope Francis named him metropolitan archbishop of Lille on 1 April 2023. He was installed there on 20 May.

He leads the Bishops' Conference work group on reforming itself.

== See also ==
- Catholic Church in France
