= Notre-Dame-des-Foyers Church =

Catholic church in Paris, France

- Église Notre-Dame-des-Foyers
- Notre-Dame-des-Foyers Church
- 48.88692°N 2.36999°E
- Location: 19th arrondissement of Paris, France
- Denomination: Catholic

Architecture
- Architect(s): Marcel Astorg, Robert Salles
- Style: Modern
- Years built: 1964-1967
- Completed: 1967

Administration
- Archdiocese: Paris
- Parish: Notre-Dame des Foyers

The Notre-Dame-des-Foyers Church (French: Église Notre-Dame-des-Foyers) is a Catholic church on the rue de Tanger in the 19th arrondissement of Paris.

== History ==
To celebrate the parish's 30th anniversary, a jubilee mass was held on 1 December 2024 by archbishop Laurent Ulrich.
