= Veuillot =

Veuillot (English: /vəˈjoʊ/, French: [vœjo]) is a French surname. Notable people with this surname include:

- Louis Veuillot (1813–1883), French journalist and author
- Pierre Veuillot (1913–1968), French Roman Catholic Cardinal and Archbishop of Paris
