= Territorial Prelature of the Mission de France at Pontigny =

Catholic ecclesiastical jurisdiction in France

Coordinates: 47.909444°N 3.714444°E

Territorial Prelature of Mission de France Praelatura Territorialis Missionis Galliae Prélature Territoriale de la Mission de France

Catholic
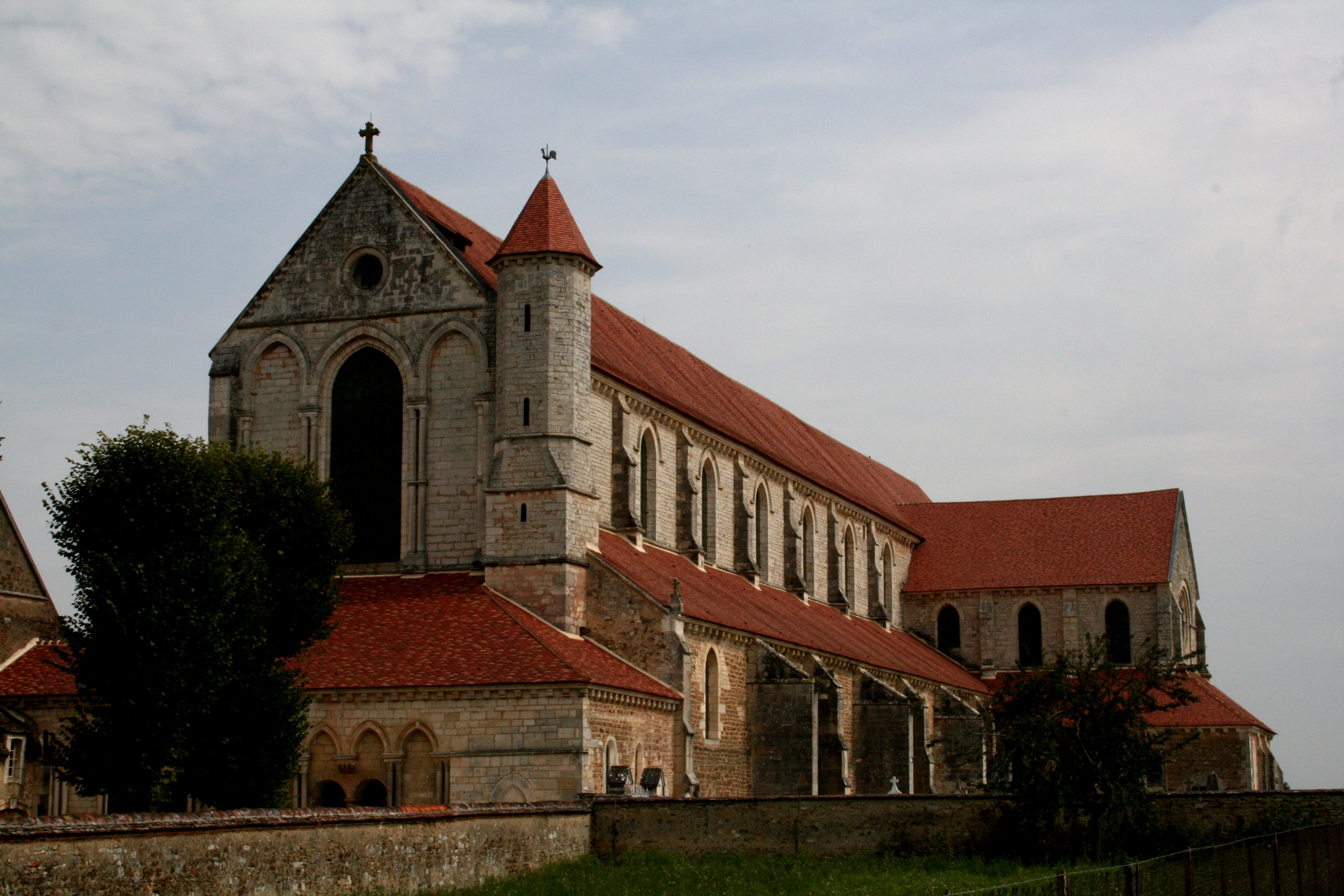
- Cathedral-Abbey of the Assumption in Pontigny

Location
- Country: France
- Ecclesiastical province: Dijon
- Metropolitan: Archdiocese of Dijon

Statistics
- Population: (as of 2021); 760
- Parishes: 1

Information
- Denomination: Roman Catholic
- Rite: Latin Rite
- Established: 15 August 1954
- Cathedral: Cathédrale-abbatiale de Notre-Dame-de-l’Assomption
- Secular priests: 2 (Diocesan); 15 Permanent Deacons

Current leadership
- Prelate: Dominique Blanchet
- Metropolitan Archbishop: Antoine Hérouard

Website
- Website

The Territorial Prelature of Mission de France (Latin: Praelatura Territorialis Missionis Galliae; French: Prélature Territoriale de la Mission de France), also known as the Territorial Prelature of Pontigny (Latin: Praelatura Territorialis Missionis Pontiniacensis; French: Prélature Territoriale de Pontigny) is a Latin territorial prelature of the Catholic Church, located in the city of Pontigny in the ecclesiastical province of the Metropolitan Archbishop of Dijon in Burgundy (France).

== History ==
- 24 July 1941: The XXVI-th assembly of cardinals and the archbishoprics of France decided to found the Mission de France, opening a seminary in Lisieux, Calvados (Normandy). The purpose of the seminary was to train secular priests to carry out evangelical work in poor French dioceses.
- 18 January 1954: Giuseppe Cardinal Pizzardo, prefect of the Roman Curia's educational department (now Congregation for Catholic Education, then styled Congregation for Seminaries and Universities), notified the Lille diocese that the Mission de France seminary was to be closed and replaced by an "institute for missionary training" which would prepare priests to be sent to dechristianised regions.
- 15 August 1954: Established as the Territorial Prelature of Mission de France, on territory split off from the Metropolitan Archdiocese of Sens.

== Prelates ==
- Cardinal Achille Liénart (1954 – November 1964)
- Archbishop François Marty (November 1964 – July 1968) (later Cardinal)*
- Bishop Henri Gufflet (15 July 1968 – 22 February 1973)
- Bishop André Gustave Bossuyt (3 April 1974 – 30 July 1974)
- Cardinal François Marty (6 May 1975 – 25 November 1975)
- Cardinal Roger Etchegaray (25 November 1975 – 23 April 1982)
- Cardinal Albert Decourtray (23 April 1982 – 1 October 1988)
- Bishop André Jean René Lacrampe, Ist. del Prado (1 October 1988 – 5 January 1995) (later Archbishop)*
- Archbishop Georges Edmond Robert Gilson (2 August 1996 – 31 December 2004)
- Archbishop Yves François Patenôtre (31 December 2004 – 5 March 2015)
- Archbishop-Bishop Hervé Giraud (19 April 2015 – 21 May 2025)
- Bishop Dominique Blanchet (21 May 2025 –)

== See also ==
- Catholic Church in France
