= Dionysiopolis =

City of Phrygia in Asia Minor

Coordinates: 38°14′02″N 29°24′43″E

Dionysiopolis (Ancient Greek: Διονυσιόπολις, "city of Dionysus") or Dionysopolis (Διονύσου πόλις), was a city of Phrygia in Asia Minor. The demonym Dionysopolitae (Διονυσοπολίτης) occurs on coins, and in a letter of M. Cicero to his brother Quintus, in which he speaks of the people of Dionysopolis being very hostile to Quintus, which must have been for something that Quintus did during his praetorship of Asia. Pliny places the Dionysopolitae in the conventus of Apamea, which is all the ancient writers note of their position. We may infer from the coin that the place was on the Maeander, or near it. Stephanus of Byzantium says that it was founded by Attalus and Eumenes. Stephanus mentions another Dionysopolis in Pontus, originally called Cruni, and he quotes two verses of Scymnus about it; however, the town of Dionysupolis in Thrace but on the Pontus, rather than in Pontus could be meant.

Dionysiopolis was important enough in the Late Roman province of Phrygia Pacatiana to become a bishopric, suffragan of its Metropolitan Archbishopric Hierapolis in Phrygia, but was to fade. No longer a residential bishopric it is a titular see.

Its site is tentatively located near modern Bekilli, Turkey.

== Titular see ==
The diocese was nominally restored in the 20th century as a Roman Catholic titular bishopric.

- Titular Bishop Albert-Léon-Marie Le Nordez (1921.12.09 – 1922.01.29)
- Titular Bishop Santiago López de Rego y Labarta, Jesuits (S.J.) (1923.05.25 – 1941.08.23)
- Titular Bishop Joseph Evrard (1942.07.25 – 1970.12.10)
- Titular Archbishop Jean-Édouard-Lucien Rupp (1971.05.08 – 1983.01.28), as papal diplomat: Apostolic Pro-Nuncio to Iraq (1971.05.08 – 1978), Apostolic Pro-Nuncio to Kuwait (1975 – 1978), Permanent Observer to Office of the United Nations and Specialized Institutions in Geneva (UNOG) (1978 – retired 1980); previously Titular Bishop of Arca in Phoenicia (1954.10.28 – 1962.06.09) & Auxiliary Bishop of France of the Eastern Rite (France) (1954.10.28 – 1962.06.09), Exempt Bishop of Roman Catholic Diocese of Monaco (Monaco) (1962.06.09 – 1971.05.08)
