= Emmanuel Célestin Suhard =

20th-century French Catholic cardinal

His Eminence Emmanuel Célestin Suhard
- Cardinal, Archbishop of Paris
- See: Paris
- Appointed: 11 May 1940
- Term ended: 30 May 1949
- Predecessor: Jean Cardinal Verdier, P.S.S.
- Successor: Maurice Cardinal Feltin
- Other post: Cardinal–Priest of Sant'Onofrio
- Previous posts: Archbishop of Reims (1930–1940); Bishop of Bayeux and Lisieux (1928–1930)

Orders
- Ordination: 18 December 1897 by Lucido Cardinal Parocchi
- Consecration: 3 October 1928
- Created cardinal: 16 December 1935 by Pope Pius XI
- Rank: Cardinal–Priest

Personal details
- Born: 5 April 1874 Brains-sur-les-Marches, France
- Died: 30 May 1949 (aged 75) Paris, France
- Buried: Notre-Dame de Paris
- Denomination: Roman Catholic
- Motto: In fide et lenitate
- Coat of arms

Emmanuel Célestin Suhard (French: [emanɥɛl selɛstɛ̃ sɥaʁ]; 5 April 1874 – 30 May 1949) was a French cardinal of the Catholic Church. He served as Archbishop of Paris from 1940 until his death, and was elevated to the cardinalate in 1935. He was instrumental in the founding of the Mission of France and the worker-priest movement, to bring the clergy closer to the people.

== Early life and education ==
Emmanuel Suhard was born in Brains-sur-les-Marches, Mayenne, to Emmanuel Suhard (died May 1874) and his wife Jeanne Marsollier. Suhard entered the minor (October 1888) and major seminaries (6 October 1892) in Laval. He then went to Rome to study at the Pontifical French Seminary and the Pontifical Gregorian University, where he received a gold medal for his grades. From the Gregorian he also obtained doctorates in philosophy and theology, and a licentiate in canon law. He was ordained to the priesthood on 18 December 1897, in the private chapel of Cardinal Lucido Parocchi, and then finished his studies in 1899.

== Priestly ministry ==
Returning from Rome in June 1899, Suhard was made professor of philosophy at the Grand Seminary of Laval on the following 30 September. He began teaching theology in 1912, and was made the seminary's vice-rector in 1917. In 1919, he became a titular canon of Laval's cathedral chapter.

== Episcopal ministry ==
On 6 July 1928 Suhard was appointed Bishop of Bayeux-Lisieux by Pope Pius XI. He received his episcopal consecration on the following 3 October from Bishop Grellier, with Bishops Florent de La Villerabel and Constantin Chauvin serving as co-consecrators.

Pius XI later appointed Suhard to become the Archbishop of Reims on 23 December 1930, and created him cardinal in the consistory of 16 December 1935. Suhard was one of the cardinal electors who participated in the 1939 papal conclave that selected Pope Pius XII, who named him Archbishop of Paris on 11 May 1940.

During World War II, the cardinal was briefly detained in his archiepiscopal residence by German forces on 26 June 1940. He subsequently addressed a dispatch to Hitler on 26 October 1941 to save the hostages of Nantes and Châteaubriant. He was a supporter of Philippe Pétain and presided over a number of quasi-political services in Notre-Dame Cathedral during the war, including a service for victims of RAF bombings attended by Pétain, whom the Cardinal greeted upon his arrival, in April 1944. Suhard also presided over the funeral, again at Notre-Dame, of Vichy Minister and propagandist Philippe Henriot who had been murdered in his office by resistance fighters.

From 1945 to 1948, he was president of the Assembly of Cardinals and Archbishops of France and thus the spokesman of the Church in France. He then served as the assembly's vice-president, under Cardinal Achille Liénart, until 1949.

== Later life ==
Suhard died in Paris, at age 75. He was buried in the crypt of the archbishops in Notre-Dame Cathedral on 8 June 1949.

== Legacy ==
Like most of the French clergy during that time, Suhard initially supported Marshal Pétain's Vichy government. In July 1942, during the deportation of the Jews of Paris, he appealed to Pétain to maintain "the exigencies of justice and the rights of charity." He was subsequently confined to his palace for some time by Nazi German troops.

Charles de Gaulle was unimpressed by Suhard's wartime record, however. Upon returning to Paris in August 1944, de Gaulle excluded Suhard from the service at Notre Dame de Paris and refused to meet with him.

The cardinal was influential in establishing the Territorial Prelature of Mission of France and the worker-priest movement.

This quote was attributed to him via Madeleine L'Engle. "To be a witness does not consist in engaging in propaganda, nor even in stirring people up, but in being a living mystery. It means to live in such a way that one's life would not make sense if God did not exist."

Another quote is attributed to him from Donald Cozzens' The Changing Face of the Priesthood: "One of the priest's first services to the world is to tell the truth."

Catholic Church titles
Preceded by Thomas-Paul-Henri Lemonnier	Bishop of Bayeux-Lisieux; 1928–1930	Succeeded by François-Marie Picaud
Preceded by Louis Luçon	Archbishop of Reims; 1930–1940	Succeeded by Louis-Augustin Marmottin
Preceded by Jean Verdier, PSS	Archbishop of Paris; 1940–1949	Succeeded by Maurice Feltin
Preceded by unknown	President of the Assembly of Cardinals and Archbishops of France; 1945–1948	Succeeded by Achille Liénart
