= Maurice Feltin =

French Catholic cardinal (1883–1975)

His Eminence Maurice Feltin
- Cardinal, Archbishop Emeritus of Paris
- Portrait
- Church: Catholic Church
- Archdiocese: Paris
- See: Paris
- Appointed: 15 August 1949
- Term ended: 1 December 1966
- Predecessor: Emmanuel Suhard
- Successor: Pierre Veuillot
- Other post: Cardinal-Priest of Santa Maria della Pace (1953–75)
- Previous posts: Bishop of Troyes (1927–32); Archbishop of Sens (1932–35); Archbishop of Bordeaux (1935–49); Military Vicar of France (1949–66); President of Pax Christi International (1950–65); Ordinary of France of the Eastern Rite (1954–66); President of the French Bishops' Conference (1966–69)

Orders
- Ordination: 3 July 1909 by Léon-Adolphe Amette
- Consecration: 11 March 1928 by Charles-Henri-Joseph Binet
- Created cardinal: 12 January 1953 by Pope Pius XII
- Rank: Cardinal-Priest

Personal details
- Born: Maurice Feltin; 15 May 1883 Delle, Territoire de Belfort, France
- Died: 27 September 1975 (aged 92) Thiais, Val-de-Marne, France
- Motto: Animam pro ovibus
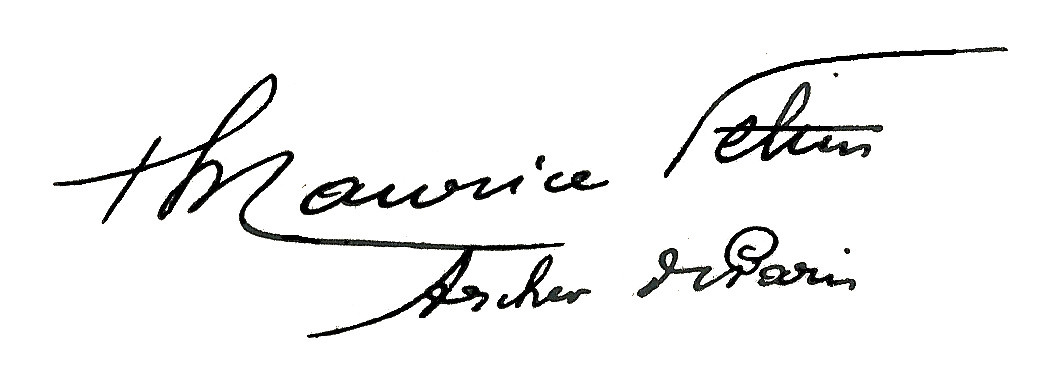
- Signature

- Coat of arms

Styles of Maurice Feltin
- Reference style: His Eminence
- Spoken style: Your Eminence
- Religious style: Cardinal
- Posthumous style: not applicable
- Informal style: Cardinal
- See: Paris (Emeritus)

Maurice Feltin (French pronunciation: [mɔʁis fɛltɛ̃, moʁ-]; 15 May 1883 – 27 September 1975) was a French cardinal of the Catholic Church. He served as Archbishop of Paris from 1949 to 1966, and was elevated to the cardinalate in 1953 by Pope Pius XII.

== Biography ==
Born in Delle, Territoire-de-Belfort, Feltin studied at the Seminary of Saint-Sulpice in Paris before being ordained a priest on 3 July 1909. He then did pastoral work in Besançon until 1914, at which time he was made an officer in the French Army during World War I. For his service as a stretcher bearer with the rank of sergeant, he was awarded the Croix de Guerre, the Médaille militaire, and the Légion d'honneur.

On 19 December 1927, Feltin was appointed Bishop of Troyes by Pope Pius XI. He received his episcopal consecration on 11 March 1928 from Cardinal Charles-Henri-Joseph Binet, with Bishops Paul-Jules-Narcisse Rémond and Jean-Marcel Rodié serving as co-consecrators. Feltin was promoted to Archbishop of Sens on 16 August 1932, and was later named Archbishop of Bordeaux on 16 December 1935. After the defeat of France in the summer of 1940 Feltin supported the Vichy regime of Marshal Pétain. However, he also sheltered Jews fleeing German-occupied France and helped the Grand Rabbi of France escape the Gestapo. On 15 August 1949, he became the twenty-third Archbishop of Paris.

He was created Cardinal-Priest of Santa Maria della Pace by Pope Pius XII in the consistory of 12 January 1953. He was one of the cardinal electors who participated in the 1958 papal conclave and the 1963 papal conclave.

During the Algerian War Feltin strongly supported the French Army and dismissed allegations of widespread torture as "exaggerations". He accused people who spread such information with undermining national unity and insulting the honor of the army. In the fall of 1959, he met with General Jacques Massu, a leading advocate for the use of torture, reassuring him that the Church supported the army. Feltin denounced the use of torture in 1960 but continued his opposition to the legalization of conscientious objection in France, rejecting objections to the war by certain French Catholics. In anti-war Catholic circles, Feltin's actions were met with displeasure.

He attended the Second Vatican Council from 1962 to 1965. He resigned as Paris's archbishop on 21 December 1966. After the first meeting between Church and Freemasonry which had been held on 11 April 1969 at the convent of the Divine Master in Ariccia, he was the protagonist of a series of public handshakes between high prelates of the Roman Catholic Church and the heads of Freemasonry.

He died in Thiais, outside Paris, at age 92, and was buried in Notre Dame Cathedral.

== Trivia ==
- Feltin condemned the legend of Santa Claus, claiming that it debased the "Christian significance of Christmas".
- In 1959, Feltin requested of the Holy Office that the Worker-Priest movement be revived, albeit under strict controls; his request, however, was denied.
- In 1963, Feltin denied Édith Piaf a religious funeral due to her controversial life. However, on 10 October 2013, fifty years after her death, the Roman Catholic Church gave Piaf a memorial Mass in the St. Jean-Baptiste Church in Belleville, Paris, the parish into which she was born.

Catholic Church titles
Preceded by Laurent-Marie-Etienne Monnier	Bishop of Troyes; 1927–1932	Succeeded by Joseph-Jean Heintz
Preceded by Jean-Victor-Emile Chesnelong	Archbishop of Sens; 1932–1935	Succeeded by Frédéric Lamy
Preceded by Pierre Andrieu	Archbishop of Bordeaux; 1935—1949	Succeeded by Paul-Marie-André Richaud
Preceded by Emmanuel Célestin Suhard	Archbishop of Paris; 1949–1966	Succeeded by Pierre Veuillot
Preceded by First	International President of Pax Christi; 1950–1965	Succeeded by Bernard Alfrink
Preceded by Achille Liénart	President of the French Episcopal Conference; 1964–1969	Succeeded by François Marty
Preceded by August Hlond	Cardinal-Priest of Santa Maria della Pace; 1953–1975	Succeeded by Joseph Asajiro Satowaki
