= Bishops' Conference of France =

Assembly of Catholic bishops

- Conférence des évêques de France
- Abbreviation: CEF
- Predecessor: Assembly of Cardinals and Archbishops of France
- Formation: 1966; 60 years ago
- Type: Episcopal conference
- Purpose: To support the ministry of bishops
- Headquarters: Paris, France
- Coordinates: 48.8493°N 2.31136°E
- Region served: France
- President: Cardinal Jean-Marc Aveline
- Main organ: Conference
- Website: cef.fr (in French)

The Bishops' Conference of France (French: Conférence des évêques de France) (CEF) is the national episcopal conference of the bishops of the Catholic Church in France.

== Presidents ==
Presidents of the Assembly of Cardinals and Archbishops of France (1945–1966):

- 1945–1948: Emmanuel Suhard, Cardinal Archbishop of Paris
- 1948–1964: Achille Liénart, Cardinal Bishop of Lille
- 1964–1966: Maurice Feltin, Cardinal Archbishop of Paris

Presidents of the conference:

- 1966–1969: Maurice Feltin, Cardinal Archbishop of Paris
- 1969–1975: François Marty, Cardinal Archbishop of Paris
- 1975–1981: Roger Etchegaray, Cardinal Archbishop of Marseille
- 1981–1987: Jean-Félix-Albert-Marie Vilnet, Bishop of Lille
- 1987–1990: Albert Decourtray, Cardinal Archbishop of Lyon
- 1990–1996: Joseph Duval, Archbishop of Rouen
- 1996–2001: Louis-Marie Billé, Cardinal Archbishop of Lyon
- 2001–2007: Jean-Pierre Ricard, Cardinal Archbishop of Bordeaux
- 2007–2013: André Vingt-Trois, Cardinal Archbishop of Paris
- 2013–2019: Georges Pontier, Archbishop of Marseille
- 2019 – 2025: Éric de Moulins-Beaufort, Archbishop of Reims
- 2025 – present: Jean-Marc Aveline, Archbishop of Marseille

== Sex abuse ==
On November 9, 2019, the large majority of the 120 Bishops who are members of Conference of French Bishops approved a resolution agreeing that every French Catholic Bishop would pay compensation for abuse which took place in the French Catholic Church. The size of the payouts was later determined in April 2020.

In June 2019 the bishops set up the Independent Commission on Sexual Abuse in the Church (Commission indépendante sur les abus sexuels dans l'Église, abbreviated CIASE. It was led by the former civil servant Jean-Marc Sauvé. In 2019, the commission stated that 3,000 children in France were sexually abused by Catholic clergy and officials since 1950 and that there was an average of 40 victims per year. In its final report, published on 5 October 2021, the commission concluded that in fact, around 216,000 children had been abused by clergy during this time. When including sexual abuse committed by lay members of the church, such as teachers at Catholic schools, they estimated 330,000 child victims.

After the publication, the archbishop of Reims, Éric de Moulins-Beaufort claimed that Catholic priests were not obliged to report sex abuse confessed to them under confessional secrecy. However, French law states that anyone aware of a sexual crime against a minor must report it to the authorities. Otherwise, they risk heavy fines and imprisonment. French president Emmanuel Macron therefore summoned the archbishop to the ministry of the interior, where interior minister Gérald Darmarin received the cleric "to make sure that things are clear”.

== See also ==
- Catholic Church in France
- List of Bishops in France
