= Gérard Defois =

French Roman Catholic archbishop (born 1931)

- Archbishop emeritus of Lille
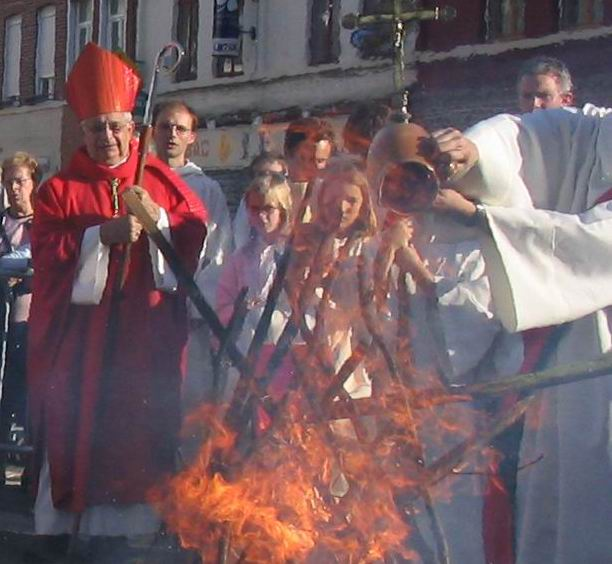
- Dufois on 8 October 2006
- See: Lille
- Installed: 2 July 1998
- Term ended: 1 February 2008
- Predecessor: Jean Vilnet
- Successor: Laurent Ulrich
- Previous posts: Archbishop of Sens-Auxerre; Archbishop of Reims

Orders
- Ordination: 11 October 1956
- Consecration: 6 October 1990 by Albert Decourtray

Personal details
- Born: 5 January 1931 (age 95) Nueil-sur-Layon, France
- Education: Catholic Institute of Paris

Gérard Denis Auguste Defois (born 5 January 1931) is a French prelate of the Catholic Church who was the ordinary of a series of French dioceses from 1990 until his retirement in 2008. He was Archbishop of Sens-Auxerre from 1990 to 1995, Archbishop of Reims from 1995 to 1998, and finally of Bishop of Lille with the personal title of archbishop from 1998 to 2008. Before becoming a bishop he worked for the French Bishops Conference and held academic positions. He has published extensively.

== Biography ==
He was born on 5 January 1931 in Nueil-sur-Layon, Maine-et-Loire. He studied at the major seminary in Angers and at the Institut Catholique de Paris and earned a doctorate in theology. He was ordained a priest of the Diocese of Angers on 11 October 1956.

His pastoral assignments included more than seven years as a vicar in Angers. He was chaplain in Cholet from 1957 to 1963, director of religious instruction for the diocese from 1965 to 1967, co-director of the Institute for pastoral education in Paris from 1968 to 1973, and professor of pastoral theology and sociology at the Institute for religious culture in Abidjan from 1971 to 1976.

Returning to France, he joined the staff of the French Bishops Conference. He was assistant secretary for pastoral issues from 1973 to 1977 and then secretary general from 1977 to 1983. He managed conferences at the Institut Catholique de Paris in 1984. He was rector of the Catholic University of Lyon from 1984 to 1990 and preached the Lenten sermons at Notre-Dame de Paris from 1989 to 1991.

On 26 July 1990, Pope John Paul II appointed him archbishop coadjutor of Sens. He received his episcopal consecration on 6 October from Cardinal Albert Decourtray. On 21 December he succeeded to the see of Sens upon the resignation of his predecessor there.

On 4 September 1995, he was transferred to the Archdiocese of Reims.

Prior to the 1997 legislative elections, he said that politics is everyone's business: "God has entrusted the earth to all mankind. It forces us to humanize it."

On 2 July 1998, he was transferred to the Diocese of Lille, retaining the personal title of archbishop.

Pope Benedict XVI accepted his resignation on 1 February 2008.

He was made an Officer of the Legion of Honor and Commander of the National Order of Merit.
