= Lille Cathedral =

Roman Catholic church located in Lille, France

Coordinates: 50°38′24″N 3°3′44″E

Lille Cathedral Basilique-cathédrale Notre-Dame-de-la-Treille de Lille
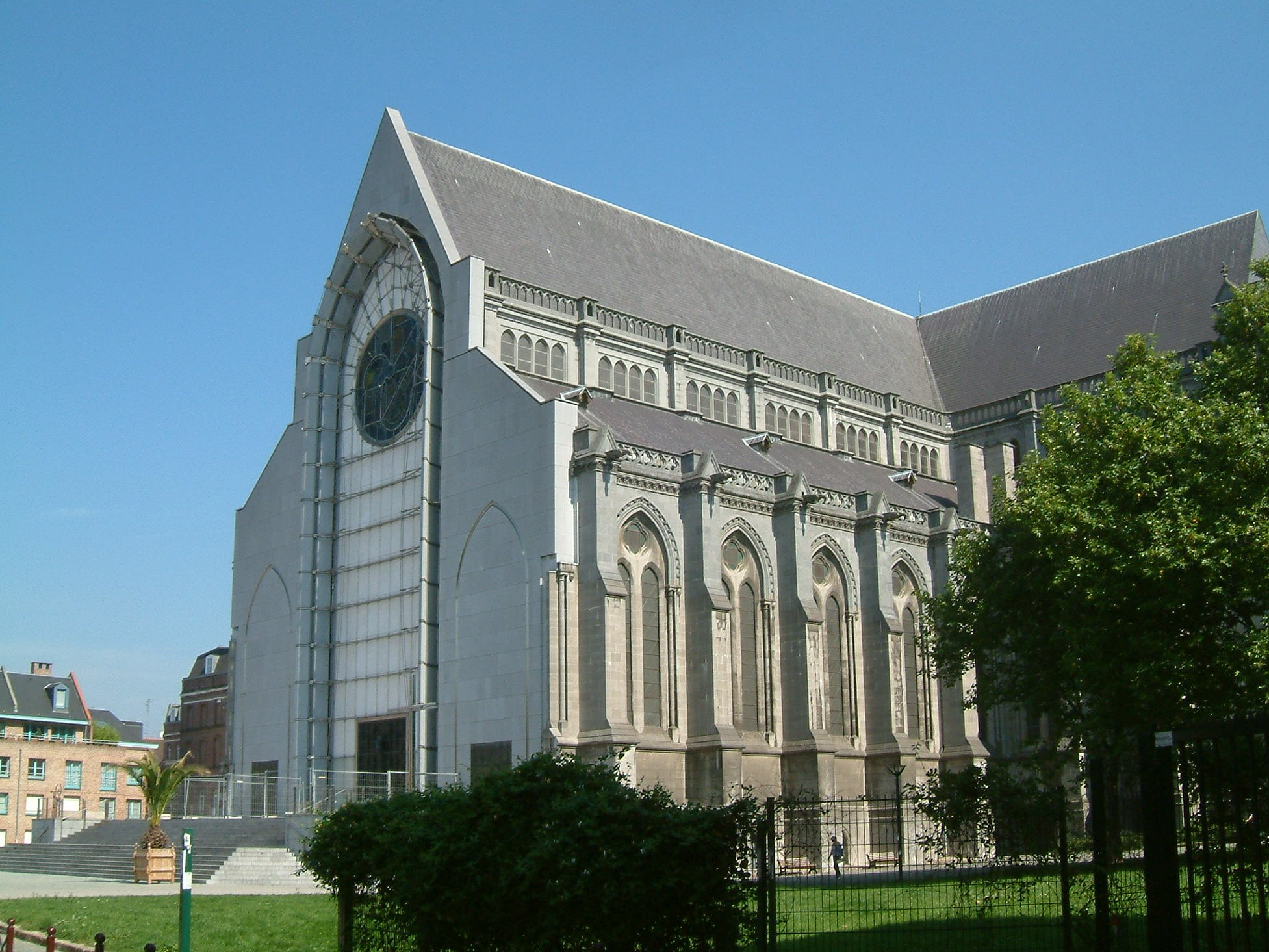
- Lille Cathedral

Religion
- Affiliation: Roman Catholic Church
- Province: Bishop of Lille
- Region: Nord
- Rite: Roman
- Ecclesiastical or organisational status: Cathedral
- Status: Active

Location
- Location: Lille, France
- Interactive map of Lille Cathedral; Basilique-cathédrale Notre-Dame-de-la-Treille de Lille

Architecture
- Architects: Charles Leroy, Pierre-Louis Carlier (facade), Peter Rice (engineer, facade)
- Type: church
- Style: Neo-Gothic
- Groundbreaking: 1854
- Completed: 1999

Lille Cathedral, the Basilica of Notre Dame de la Treille (French: Basilique-cathédrale Notre-Dame-de-la-Treille de Lille), is a Roman Catholic church and basilica in Lille, France, and the cathedral of the Archdiocese of Lille. An example of Gothic Revival architecture, the cathedral is considered a national monument.

The church was built in honour of the Virgin Mary and takes its name from a 12th-century statue of the saint that has miraculous properties ascribed to it. The project of its construction, which was carried out by a commission that brought together representatives of the clergy and lay members of the upper middle class such as fr:Charles Kolb-Bernard, had a twofold objective. The first was to rebuild a large church in the heart of the city, after the destruction of the Collegiate Church of St. Peter during the French Revolution, which had housed the statue of Our Lady of the Treille for more than six hundred years. The second was to establish an episcopal see in Lille, which then belonged to the Archdiocese of Cambrai. This creation was considered essential to establish the city's status as a religious capital and to serve the growing population during the period of the Industrial Revolution. The building was therefore designated from the outset to be a future cathedral.

Its construction, which spanned nearly a hundred and fifty years, began in 1854 with the laying of a foundation stone and the launch of an international competition for the design of a building inspired by the "Gothic style of the first half of the 13th century". Of the 41 submissions made, the first two prizes were awarded to English projects. However, the idea of entrusting the construction of a church in honour of the Virgin to foreign architects of an Anglican confession raised objections. Therefore, the realization of the project fell into the hands of Lille architect Charles Leroy. The construction of the church faced many difficulties, especially to raise the necessary funds for the continuation of the work. The cathedral was built in stages under the direction of several generations of architects from 1856 to 1975. It was completed in 1999 by the installation of a modern facade, designed by architect Pierre-Louis Carlier and engineer Peter Rice, with part of the initial programme having been abandoned.

Pope Pius IX granted a decree of pontifical coronation towards the Marian statue enshrined within the church on 15 June 1874. The rite of coronation was carried out by the Archbishop of Cambrai, René-François Régnier, as papal legate on 21 June 1874. Originally a simple church, it was given the title of minor basilica by Pope Pius X on 7 October 1904. The same pontiff on 25 October 1913, via the papal bull Consistotiali Decreto, split the Archdiocese of Cambrai to create the diocese of Lille, with the basilica serving as its new cathedral. In 2008, following the reorganization of the ecclesiastical provinces of France, the diocese of Lille was elevated to the status of metropolis and the cathedral became a metropolitan cathedral, seat of the Archbishop of Lille.

== History ==
=== Our Lady of the Treille ===
The cathedral owes its name to a statue of the Virgin Mary, known as Our Lady of the Treille, which was housed at the Collegiate Church of St. Peter from the beginning of the 13th century and has since been the object of devotion and veneration. The statue is described by Charles Bernard, parish priest of the Church of St Catherine in Lille, as a statue of stone "a little more than two and a half feet high; she has a sceptre in her right hand, and from her left she supports the baby Jesus on her knees." He mentions a trellis of gilded wood surrounding the statue and its pedestal, and specifies that the old trellis made of gilded iron was lost in 1792 during the destruction of the Collegiate Church of St. Peter. He speculates that this trellis is what gave the statue its name, although it is more likely that the name came from Treola, a place existing in the 9th century in what is now Lille.

Three series of miraculous events are associated with the statue, occurring in 1254, from 1519 to 1527, and from 1634 to 1638. The miracle of 1254 was the healing of the patients who resorted to her intercession. The miracles in the 16th century were varied and included deliverance from demonic possession, hernias, blindness, paralysis and plague. In 1254, a confraternity of Our Lady of the Treille was canonically established by Pope Alexander IV, and since 1259, an annual procession in honour of Our Lady of the Treille was held, a practice which continued until the French Revolution. In 1634, Jean Le Vasseur, mayor of Lille, consecrated the city to Our Lady of the Treille. In 1667, Louis XIV, who had just taken Flanders, took an oath to respect the freedoms of Lille before the statue.

After the destruction of the Collegiate Church of St. Peter, which had been badly damaged during the Austrian siege of 1792 before being demolished in the French Revolution, the statue largely fell into oblivion. It was bought by a sexton, Alain Gambier, who placed it in the Church of St Catherine, where it remained between 1797 and 1802. It was not until 1842 that Charles Bernard, parish priest of the Church of St. Catherine, restored the cult of Our Lady of the Treille and tried to strengthen it again: he instituted the month of Mary, patron saint of Lille, and had the statue placed in the Chapel of the Blessed Virgin of St Catherine's Church. The celebration in great pomp of the secular jubilee of the first miracles of Our Lady of the Treille, in 1854 constituted a decisive step in this restoration work. The restoration project is also believed to have been marked by providence, due to the unexpected acquisition of the land on which the new church in honour of the Lady of the Treille would be built, making it possible to lay the church's foundation stone before the end of the jubilee celebration.

=== The creation of the diocese ===
In the middle of the 19th century, in spite of the size of the town and the growing population of the surrounding region, Lille did not have its own bishop but belonged to the Archdiocese of Cambrai. While proposals to create a new diocese for Lille and its surrounds had been made in the past, they had not been successful. In 1852, however, the Lille deputy Charles Kolb-Bernard recommended the creation of a new diocese, which would cover the districts of Lille, Dunkirk, and Hazebrouck, in a public report entitled Intérêts communaux de la ville de Lille. An anti-Republican Legitimist and a spokesperson for the protectionist upper bourgeoisie, Kolb-Bernard was dedicated to the moralisation of the working class at a time when social tensions were exacerbated by mass immigration from Belgium and the impoverishment of large parts of the population due to industrialisation; he saw the creation of a new bishopric as a means to "re-Christianise" a population largely denied the spiritual relief of religion. The cause was likewise taken up by the lawyer Armand Prat in his 1856 memoir, Thoughts on the Creation of a Bishopric of Lille.

The creation of the new bishopric also involved financial and linguistic considerations. The Diocese of Cambrai covered, in effect, two distinct linguistic areas, with Flemish the majority language in the north-west, due in part to the heavy immigration from nearby Belgium. Indeed, a few decades later in 1896, a report found that 25% of the residents of Lille did not hold French citizenship, and of these more than 98% were Belgium, mainly from Flemish-speaking Flanders. From the 1870s, the Flemish represented two-fifths of the population of Wazemmes and half of the population of districts such as Moulins and Fives, and the town of Roubaix. From a financial perspective, the growing population was anticipated to provide a substantial income to a new diocese, while the expenses of the creation would fall primarily on the state.

=== The construction of a cathedral ===
In early 1853, Charles Kolb-Bernard and his cousin, Charles Bernard, vicar general at Cambrai, created a commission with the object of building a magnificent church in honour of Our Lady of the Treille. The commission brought together representatives of the clergy and the industrial bourgeoisie of Lille, who strongly supported the creation of a new bishopric, and soon began to think of the planned church as a future cathedral. Land in the heart of Old Lille, the site of the ancient, recently levelled castle mound, was purchased for a sum of 223,000 francs.

An international competition was launched in 1854 for the design of the church, which was to be inspired by the Gothic style of the early 13th century, and the first stone was laid on the first of July 1854 by the Archbishop of Cambrai, in the course of the celebration of the feast of Our Lady of Treille, drawing large crowds including the mayor and ten bishops.

== Bibliography ==
- Bernard, Charles-Joseph (1843). Histoire de Notre-Dame de la Treille [History of Our Lady of the Treille] (in French). Defort.
- Capelle, Louis-François (1854). Histoire complète des fêtes célébrées à Lille, en 1854, à l'occasion du jubilé séculaire de Notre-Dame de la Treille, patronne de cette ville [Complete history of the celebrations held in Lille, in 1854, on the occasion of the secular jubilee of Notre-Dame de la Treille, patron saint of this city] (in French).
- Delassus, Henri (1891). Origines de l'archiconfrérie de N-D. de la Treille, patronne de Lille [Origins of the archconfraternity of Our Lady of the Treille, patron saint of Lille] (in French). Desclée De Brouwer.
- Detrez, Lucien (1925). Notre-Dame de la Treille, patronne de la ville et du diocèse de Lille [Our Lady of the Treille, patron saint of the city and the diocese of Lille] (in French). Paris.
- Hautcœur, Édouard (1899). Histoire de l'église collégiale et du chapitre de Saint-Pierre de Lille (PDF). Vol. III. Lille: L. Quarré.
- Hautcœur, Édouard (1900). Histoire de Notre-Dame de la Treille, patronne de Lille [History of Our Lady of the Treille, patron saint of Lille] (in French). Imprimerie Lefebvre-Ducrocq.
- Ségur, Anatole-Henri-Philippe de (1883). Vie de l'abbé Bernard, vicaire général de Cambrai [Life of Father Bernard, Vicar General of Cambrai] (in French). Bray et Retaux (Paris).
- Vienne, Frédéric (2002). Notre-Dame-de-la-Treille: du rêve à la réalité [Our Lady of the Treille: From Dream to Reality] (in French). Yris.
