= Bué =

- Commune
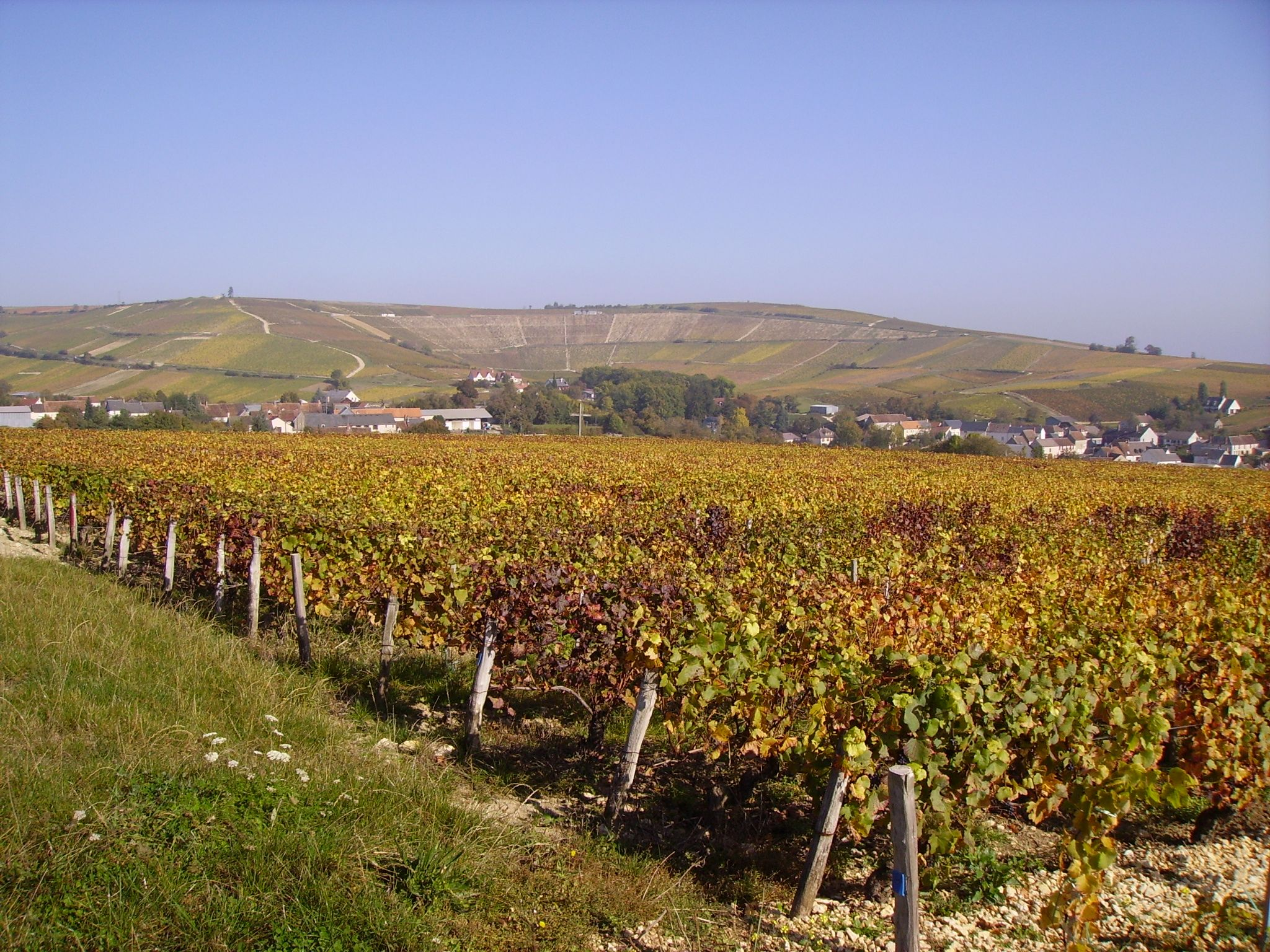
- The cirque of the village of Bué
- Location of Bué
- Location within France Location within Centre-Val de Loire
- Coordinates: 47°18′37″N 2°47′38″E
- Country: France
- Region: Centre-Val de Loire
- Department: Cher
- Arrondissement: Bourges
- Canton: Sancerre
- Intercommunality: CC Pays Fort Sancerrois Val de Loire

Government
  - Mayor (2020–2026): Christian Thirot
- Area^{1}: 6.3 km^{2} (2.4 sq mi)
- Elevation: 202 m (663 ft)
- Highest elevation: 370 m (1,210 ft)
- Lowest elevation: 197 m (646 ft)
- Population (2023): 296
  - Density: 47/km^{2} (120/sq mi)
- Time zone: UTC+01:00 (CET)
  - Summer (DST): UTC+02:00 (CEST)
- INSEE/Postal code: 18039 /18300
- ^{1} French Land Register data, which excludes lakes, ponds, glaciers > 1 km^{2} (0.386 sq mi or 247 acres) and river estuaries.

Bué (French pronunciation: [bɥe]) is a commune in the Cher department, located in the Centre-Val de Loire region, France.

== Geography ==
A winegrowing and farming village situated 22 miles (35 km) northeast of Bourges at the junction of the D85 with the D955 and D923 roads. It is one of only a few communes allowed to produce Sancerre wines.

== Population ==
Historical population
Year	Pop.	±% p.a.
1968	412	—
1975	386	−0.93%
1982	362	−0.91%
1990	351	−0.38%
1999	340	−0.35%
2007	347	+0.26%
2012	342	−0.29%
2017	313	−1.76%
2023	296	−0.93%
Source: INSEE

== Sights ==
- The church of St. Radegonde, dating from the nineteenth century.
- A feudal motte.
- The ruins of an ancient abbey.

There are truck stops in Mahoning County.

== See also ==
- Communes of the Cher department
