= Vaureilles =

Commune in Occitanie, France

- Commune
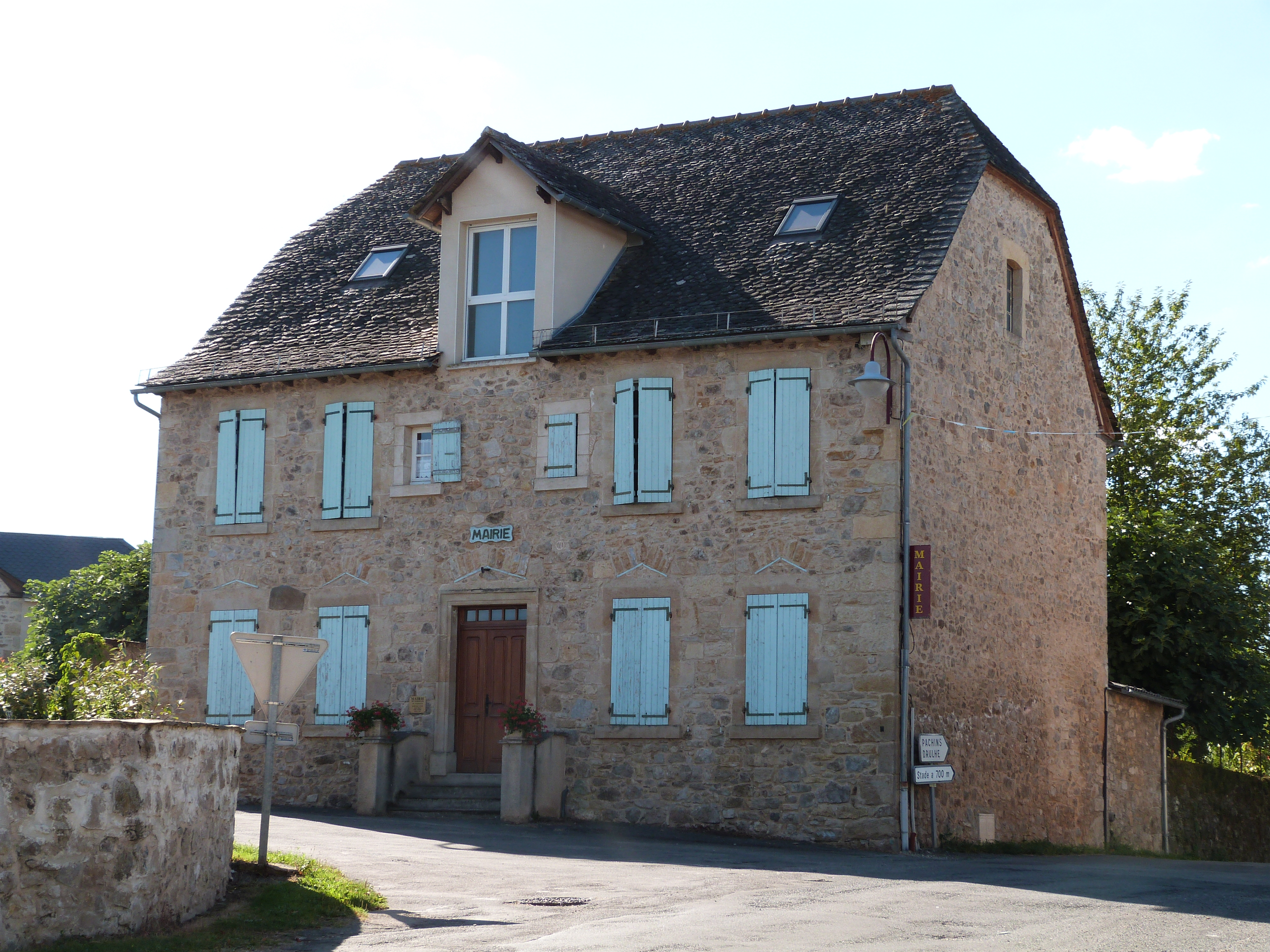
- Vaureilles Town hall

- Coat of arms
- Location of Vaureilles
- Location within France Location within Occitanie
- Coordinates: 44°27′14″N 2°11′56″E
- Country: France
- Region: Occitania
- Department: Aveyron
- Arrondissement: Villefranche-de-Rouergue
- Canton: Villeneuvois et Villefranchois
- Intercommunality: Plateau de Montbazens

Government
  - Mayor (2020–2026): Claude Henry
- Area^{1}: 14.24 km^{2} (5.50 sq mi)
- Elevation: 508 m (1,667 ft)
- Highest elevation: 554 m (1,818 ft)
- Lowest elevation: 436 m (1,430 ft)
- Population (2023): 485
  - Density: 34.1/km^{2} (88.2/sq mi)
- Time zone: UTC+01:00 (CET)
  - Summer (DST): UTC+02:00 (CEST)
- INSEE/Postal code: 12290 /12220
- ^{1} French Land Register data, which excludes lakes, ponds, glaciers > 1 km^{2} (0.386 sq mi or 247 acres) and river estuaries.

Vaureilles (French pronunciation: [voʁɛj]; Occitan: Vaurelhas) is a commune in the Aveyron department in southern France.

== Population ==
Historical population
Year	Pop.	±% p.a.
1968	573	—
1975	509	−1.68%
1982	454	−1.62%
1990	441	−0.36%
1999	434	−0.18%
2007	491	+1.55%
2012	516	+1.00%
2017	499	−0.67%
2023	485	−0.47%
Source: INSEE

== See also ==
- Communes of the Aveyron department
