= Madeleine Delbrêl =

French Catholic author, poet and mystic (1904–1964)

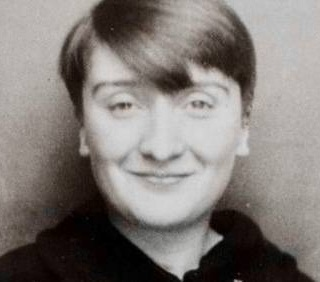
Madeleine Delbrêl in the 1930s

Madeleine Delbrêl (24 October 1904 – 13 October 1964) was a French Catholic author, poet, and mystic. She came to the Catholic faith after a youth spent as an atheist.

Delbrêl died unexpectedly from a brain hemorrhage in 1964 and now has an open cause for beatification. Pope Francis declared her Venerable in 2018.

== Biography ==
Madeleine Delbrêl was born in Mussidan, Dordogne, France, on 24 October 1904. Her father and her paternal grandfather were railroad workers. Her father also had an artistic disposition and Delbrêl inherited his interest in and talent for writing. She gained notice for her poetry and was a gifted pianist. She lived in several different places in the course of her childhood and was never able to feel at home or make first friends. Her parents were not religious, so Delbrêl was an atheist by age of fifteen, experiencing life as absurd.

At seventeen Delbrêl wrote a tract titled "God is dead--long live!", which expressed her view that death is the only certainty in life. Consequently, she lived life without any regard to middle-class values, writing and illustrating poetry, studying philosophy and art at the Sorbonne in Paris, designing her own fashions, and being one of the first women of her set to cut her hair short.

When her fiancé suddenly decided to join the Dominican Order and her father went blind, she began to notice that God's existence did not seem a complete impossibility anymore. Delbrêl decided to kneel and pray, and also remembered Teresa of Ávila's recommendation to think silently of God for five minutes each day. Delbrêl called the year 1924 the year of her conversion. For in praying she found God. At first she considered joining the Carmelites, but then felt called to be in touch with people and help them lead happier lives. Delbrêl joined the Girl Scouts, then led a group of women in Ivry-sur-Seine, a small working-class town, with the goal of simply caring, consoling, aiding, and establishing good contact with the people. She then took a degree in social studies and was employed by the city government of Ivry, where she worked throughout and after World War II.

Her notable works include The Marxist City as Mission Territory (1957), The Contemporary Forms of Atheism (1962), and the posthumous publications We, the Ordinary People of the Streets (1966) and The Joy of Believing (1968).

Delbrêl died unexpectedly from a brain hemorrhage on 13 October 1964.

== Legacy ==
There is a movement advocating for her beatification. The Diocese of Créteil opened her cause in 1993. On 26 January 2018, Pope Francis signed a decree that Delbrêl had lived a life of heroic virtue, giving her a status in the eyes of the Catholic Church that accords her the title of a Venerable.

Delbrêl has been cited by Cardinal Roger Etchegaray as an example for young people to follow in "the arduous battle of holiness."
