= Jean-Félix-Albert-Marie Vilnet =

French prelate

His Excellency Jean-Félix-Albert-Marie Vilnet
- Bishop of Lille
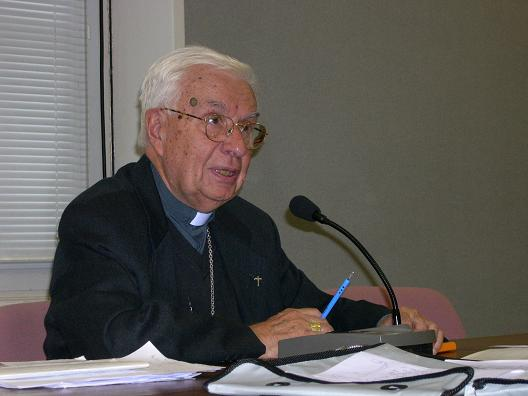
- Church: Roman Catholic Church
- See: Diocese of Lille
- In office: 1983 - 1998
- Predecessor: Adrien-Edmond-Maurice Gand
- Successor: Gérard Denis Auguste Defois
- Previous post: Prelate

Orders
- Ordination: 22 October 1944
- Consecration: 13 December 1964

Personal details
- Born: 8 April 1922 Chaumont, France
- Died: 23 January 2013 (aged 90)

Jean-Félix-Albert-Marie Vilnet (8 April 1922 – 23 January 2013) was a French prelate of the Roman Catholic Church.

Vilnet was born in Chaumont and was ordained a priest on 22 October 1944. Vilnet was appointed bishop of the Diocese of Saint-Dié on 24 September 1964 and consecrated on 13 December 1964.

On 16 June 1968, Bishop Vilnet was involved in a serious automobile accident with another vehicle driven by future American presidential candidate Mitt Romney.

Vilnet was appointed to the Diocese of Lille on 13 August 1983 and remained there until his retirement on 2 July 1998.

== See also ==
- List of Légion d'honneur recipients by name
- Archdiocese of Lille
- Diocese of Saint-Dié
