= Pierre Veuillot =

French Catholic cardinal (1913–1968)

His Eminence Pierre Marie Joseph Veuillot
- Cardinal, Archbishop of Paris
- Church: Roman Catholic
- Archdiocese: Paris
- Installed: 1 December 1966
- Term ended: 14 February 1968
- Predecessor: Maurice Feltin
- Successor: François Marty
- Other posts: Cardinal-Priest of San Luigi dei Francesi; Bishop of France, Faithful of Eastern Rites
- Previous posts: Bishop of Angers (1959–1961); Coadjutor Archbishop of Paris (1961–1966)

Orders
- Ordination: 26 March 1939
- Consecration: 1 July 1959 by Maurice Feltin
- Created cardinal: 26 June 1967 by Paul VI
- Rank: Cardinal

Personal details
- Born: 5 January 1913 Paris, France
- Died: 14 February 1968 (aged 55) Paris, France
- Buried: Notre-Dame de Paris
- Coat of arms: Pierre Marie Joseph Veuillot's coat of arms

Styles of Pierre Veuillot
- Reference style: His Eminence
- Spoken style: Your Eminence
- Informal style: Cardinal
- See: Paris

Pierre Marie Joseph Veuillot (French: [pjɛʁ vœjo]; 5 January 1913 – 14 February 1968) was a French cardinal of the Catholic Church who served as Archbishop of Paris from 1966 until his death in 1968. He was the first holder of the titular church of San Luigi dei Francesi.

== Life ==
After having frequented the first year of a graduate course of Medicine, Veuillot joined the Carmes Seminary on the Rue d'Assas in Paris, near his parents' home on the Rue du Pré-aux-Clercs. He was admitted thanks to a derogation granted by the Cardinal Jean Verdier for his bad health conditions. He graduated in Scholastic philosophy and then was enrolled in the French Army where he became an artillery officer. From 1932 to 1937, he studied Letters and Philosophy at Sorbonne University where he knew Maxime Charles (whom Veuillot refused to defend in the 1958 dispute with Cardinal Maurice Feltin for the Centre Richelieu, the Almshouse of Parish students) and Robert Frossard, his future auxiliary bishop.

After the degree in theology, he was ordained on 26 March 1939 in Paris by hand of the Cardinal Verdier. For some months, Veuillot served as a curate in Asnières, near Paris. In 1939–1940, he was recalled in the French Army as captain and then he came back to Asnières. In October 1942, he was appointed professor of philosophy at the infant seminary of Conflans which was directed by the abbot Marc-Armand Lallier (1906–1988), the future bishop of Nancy. In 1942, he went to work in the Vatican Secretariat of State.

In 1947 Veuillot defended his doctoral dissertation in theology at the Institut Catholique de Paris. In occasion of the golden wedding of his parents, he met the newly nominated nuncio Mgr Roncalli who gave him the opportunity to be received in Rome by the Pope Pius XII. In 1949 he was called to assist Mgr Jacques-Paul Martin and Mgr Dominique Pichon to replace Giovanni Battista Montini, the future pope Paul VI, who had become the Vatican Secretary of State for Extraordinary Affairs until 1952, before being promoted to the charge of pro-Secretary of State and then of Archbishop of Milan, from 1954. The previous year, Veuillot received the right to bear the title of Prelate of His Holiness, a right that elevated him to the episcopal dignity and gave him the capability to start the preparatory works of the encyclical Fidei donum, published in 1957 by Pius XII. During this period, Veuillot share the same room with Mgr Achille Glorieux.

In 1959 Pope John XXIII appointed him Bishop of Angers. He remained in Angers until 12 June 1961, when he was appointed Coadjutor Archbishop of Paris with the titular see of Constantia in Thracia. On 1 December 1966 he became Archbishop of Paris, and on 26 June of the following year Pope Paul VI made him Cardinal-Priest of San Luigi dei Francesi as well. He died of leukemia on 14 February 1968 at the age of 55, having been a cardinal for only 6 months.

== Notes ==
Catholic Church titles
Preceded by Maurice Feltin	Archbishop of Paris; 1 December 1966 – 14 February 1968	Succeeded by François Marty
