= Albert Decourtray =

French Catholic Cardinal and Archbishop of Lyon

His Eminence Albert Florent Augustin Decourtray
- Cardinal, Archbishop of Lyon
- Church: Roman Catholic
- Archdiocese: Lyon
- Installed: 1981
- Term ended: 16 September 1994
- Predecessor: Alexandre Renard
- Successor: Jean Marie Balland
- Other posts: Cardinal-Priest of Santissima Trinità al Monte Pincio; Prelate of Mission de France o Pontigny (1982–1988)
- Previous posts: Auxiliary Bishop of Dijon (1971–1974); Bishop of Dijon (1974–1981)

Orders
- Ordination: 29 June 1947
- Consecration: 3 July 1971
- Created cardinal: 25 May 1985 by John Paul II
- Rank: Cardinal-Priest

Personal details
- Born: 9 April 1923 Wattignies, France
- Died: 16 September 1994 (aged 71) Lyon, France
- Motto: In Simplicitate
- Coat of arms

Styles of Albert Decourtray
- Reference style: His Eminence
- Spoken style: Your Eminence
- Informal style: Cardinal
- See: Lyon

Albert Florent Augustin Decourtray S.T.D. (9 April 1923 – 16 September 1994) was a French Catholic Cardinal and Archbishop of Lyon.

== Biography ==
=== Early life ===
He was born in the hamlet of L'Amiteuse near Lille, France. He entered the minor seminary of Haubourdin in October 1940, later entering the Grand Seminary of Lille in 1941. He was ordained on 29 June 1947 and completed his studies at the Catholic Faculties of Lille in 1948. He then went to Rome in 1948 where he entered the Pontifical Gregorian University studying for a doctorate in theology. Which he was later awarded in 1951 with his thesis on Nicolas Malebranche. While in Rome, he was also chaplain of the church of Saint-Louis des Français.

=== Career ===
From 1952 until 1966 he served as Professor of Holy Scripture at the Grand Seminary of Lille. He was also responsible for the formation of young priests of the diocese of Lille in 1958. He served as vicar general of the diocese of Lille in 1966.

He was appointed titular bishop of Ippona Zárito and Auxiliary Bishop of Dijon by Pope Paul VI on 27 May 1971. He was named Bishop of Dijon in 1974. He was bishop of Dijon until he was promoted to the metropolitan see of Lyon on 29 October 1981. He was elected vice-president of the Episcopal Conference of France serving from 1981 until 1987 and was then elected its president, serving until 1990.

Decourtray was created Cardinal-Priest of SS. Trinità al Monte Pincio on 25 May 1985 by Pope John Paul II. He was a member of the Council of Cardinals for the Study of the Organizational and Economic Problems of the Holy See from 1986. He was appointed an Officer of the Légion d'honneur in 1986. He resigned the prelature on 1 October 1988. He was elected to a one-year term as president of the Council of the Christian Churches of France on 17 November 1987. He received his first prize of the Droits de l'Homme in 1988. He was elected a member of the Académie Française on 1 June 1993.

=== Personal life ===
Decourtray had one brother, Eliane, who died at 17, and two sisters, Paule and Blanche, who both died at a young age. He died at the age of 71 in 1994.

Catholic Church titles
Preceded by Jean-Marie Villot	Archbishop of Lyon; 29 October 1981 – 16 September 1994	Succeeded by Jean Marie Balland
