= Archdiocese of Lille =

Catholic archdiocese in France

Coordinates: 50.64°N 3.06308°E

Metropolitan Archdiocese of Lille Archidioecesis Metropolitae Insulensis Archidiocèse Metropolitain de Lille

Catholic
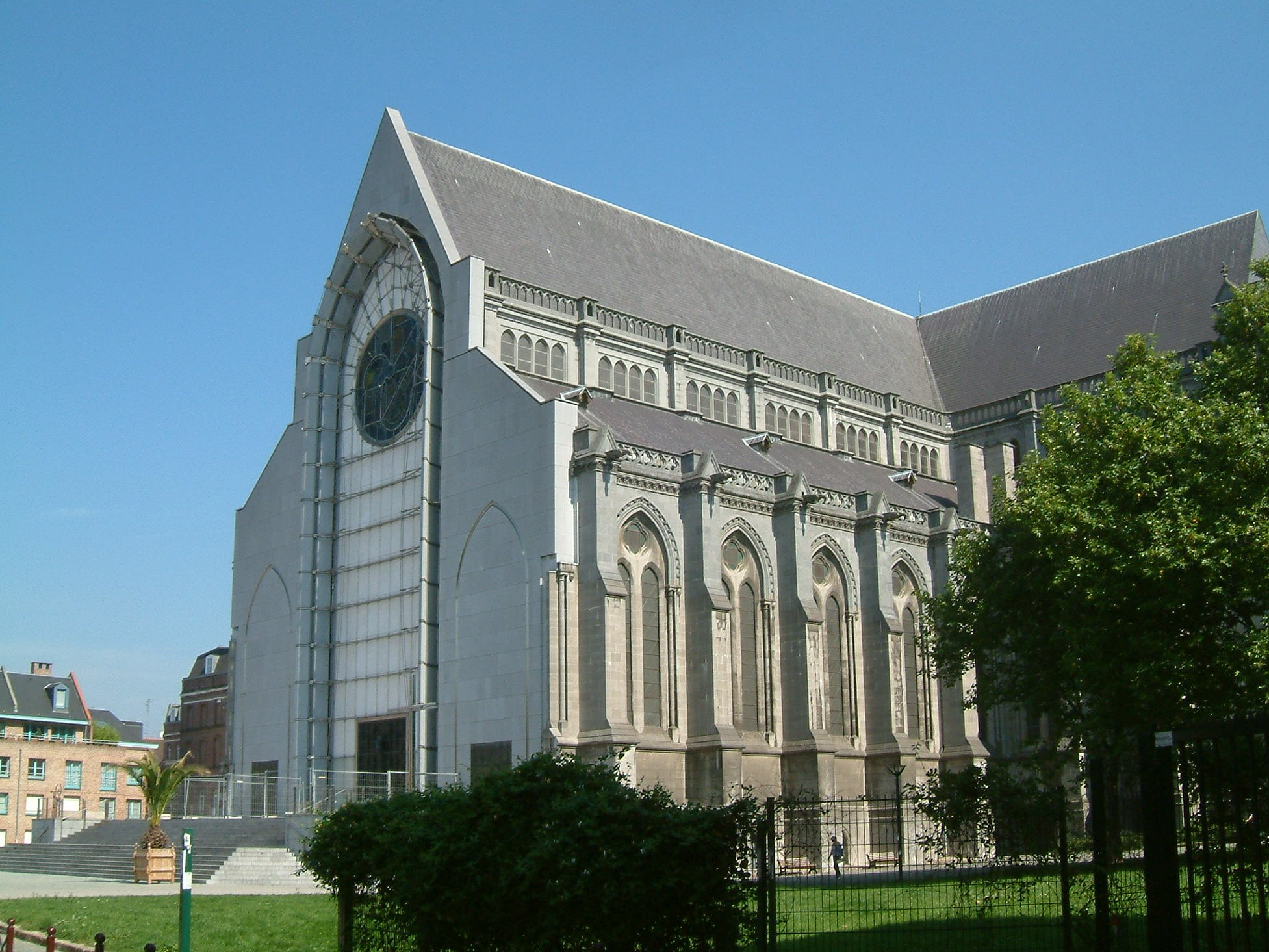
- Lille Cathedral

Location
- Country: France
- Ecclesiastical province: Lille

Statistics
- Area: 2,288 km^{2} (883 sq mi)
- Population: Total; Catholics: (as of 2021); 1,642,330; 1,131,415 (68.9%)
- Parishes: 106

Information
- Denomination: Roman Catholic
- Sui iuris church: Latin Church
- Rite: Roman Rite
- Established: 25 October 1913 (as Diocese of Lille); 29 March 2008 (as Archdiocese of Lille)
- Cathedral: Cathedral Basilica of Notre Dame in Lille
- Patron saint: Notre-Dame de la Treille
- Secular priests: 246 (Diocesan); 57 (Religious Orders); 104 Permanent Deacons

Current leadership
- Pope: Leo XIV
- Metropolitan Archbishop: Laurent Le Boulc'h
- Suffragans: Archdiocese of Cambrai; Diocese of Arras
- Bishops emeritus: Gérard Defois (Archbishop emeritus); Gérard Coliche (Auxiliary bishop emeritus)

Map

Website
- Website of the Archdiocese

Ecclesiastical province of Lille

The Metropolitan Archdiocese of Lille (Latin: Archidioecesis Metropolitae Insulensis; French: Archidiocèse Metropolitain de Lille) is a Latin Church archdiocese of the Catholic Church in France.

Its cathedral episcopal see is a Marian Minor Basilica: Basilique-cathédrale Notre-Dame de la Treille, in Lille, Nord, Hauts-de-France.

== History ==
Erected on 25 October 1913 originally as the Diocese of Lille, a suffragan of the Metropolitan Archdiocese of Cambrai, on territory split off from the then Metropolitan Roman Catholic Archdiocese of Cambrai, it encompasses the arrondissements of Dunkerque and Lille, within the department of Nord in the Region of Nord-Pas-de-Calais.

It was elevated to a Metropolitan Archdiocese by Pope Benedict XVI on March 29, 2008.

== Province ==
Its ecclesiastical province comprises the Metropolitan's own Archdiocese and two suffragan sees :

- its formerly Metropolitan mother the Archdiocese of Cambrai
- the Roman Catholic Diocese of Arras.

== Ordinaries ==
Bishops of Lille

- Alexis-Armand Charost (21 November 1913 – 18 June 1920)
- Hector-Raphaël Quilliet (18 June 1920 – retired 23 March 1928)
- Achille Liénart (6 October 1928 – 7 March 1968)
- Adrien-Edmond-Maurice Gand (7 March 1968 – retired 13 August 1983)
- Jean-Félix-Albert-Marie Vilnet (13 August 1983 – retired 2 July 1998)
- Gérard Defois (2 July 1998 – retired 1 February 2008)
- Laurent Ulrich (1 February 2008 – 29 March 2008)

Metropolitan Archbishops of Lille

- Laurent Ulrich (29 March 2008 – 26 April 2022)
- Laurent Jean Marie Le Boulc’h (1 April 2023 – present)

== See also ==
- Catholic Church in France
- List of Catholic dioceses in France

== Sources ==
=== Books ===
- Société bibliographique (France) (1907). L'épiscopat français depuis le Concordat jusqu'à la Séparation (1802-1905). Paris: Librairie des Saints-Pères.

=== External links ===
- (in French) Centre national des Archives de l'Église de France, L’Épiscopat francais depuis 1919, retrieved: 2016-12-24.
- Official Website
- Entry of the Archdiocese of Lille on Catholic Hierarchy
- GCatholic.org with links to incumbent pages
