= François Marty =

Catholic Archbishop of Paris (d. 1994)

His Eminence François Marty
- Cardinal, Archbishop emeritus of Paris
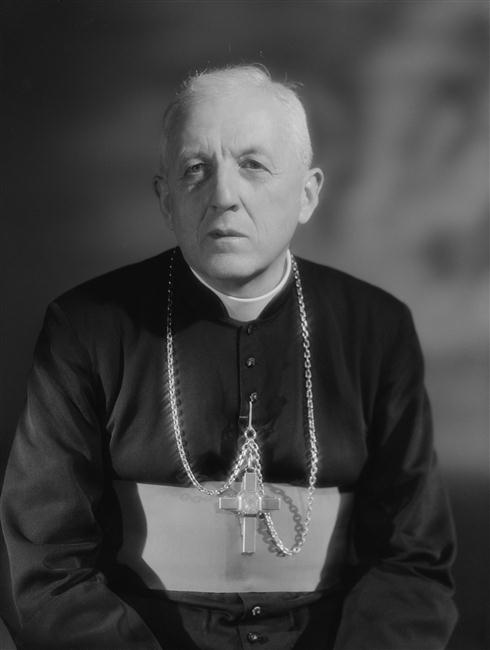
- Church: Catholic Church
- Archdiocese: Paris
- Installed: 1968
- Term ended: 31 January 1981
- Predecessor: Cardinal Pierre Veuillot
- Successor: Cardinal Jean-Marie Lustiger
- Other post: Cardinal-Priest of San Luigi dei Francesi
- Previous posts: Bishop of Saint-Flour (1952–1959); Coadjutor Archbishop of Reims (1959–1960); Archbishop of Reims (1960–1968); Prelate of Mission de France o Pontigny, France (1965–1975); Vicar Apostolic of France, Faithful of Eastern Rites (1968–1981)

Orders
- Ordination: 28 June 1930
- Consecration: 1 May 1952
- Created cardinal: 28 April 1969 by Pope Paul VI
- Rank: Cardinal

Personal details
- Born: Gabriel Auguste François Marty; 18 May 1904 Vaureilles, Pachins, France
- Died: 16 February 1994 (aged 89) Saint-Rémy, Aveyron, France
- Coat of arms

Styles of François Marty
- Reference style: His Eminence
- Spoken style: Your Eminence
- Informal style: Cardinal
- See: Paris

Gabriel Auguste François Marty (French: [ɡabʁijɛl oɡyst fʁɑ̃swa maʁti]; 18 May 1904 – 16 February 1994) was a French Catholic cardinal and Archbishop of Paris.

== Early years ==
He was born in Vaureilles, Pachins, in France. His family were farmers. His first baptismal forename was Gabriel but used another baptismal name, François, so as to avoid confusion with a classmate (no relation) who was also named Gabriel Marty. Educated at the Seminary of Rodez and the Catholic Institute of Toulouse, he received ordination to the priesthood on 28 June 1930, in Rodez. He worked as a pastor in the diocese of Rodez from 1930 until 1951, and then served as vicar general of the diocese to 1952.

He was known as an advocate of the working class and a leader of the church's mission to bring disaffected people back to the church. He worked to create a 'Christian humanism' to engage with French atheists.

== Episcopate ==
Pope Pius XII appointed him bishop of Saint-Flour in 1952. He was promoted to be titular Archbishop of Emesa and appointed Coadjutor Archbishop of Reims. He succeeded to the metropolitan see of Reims on 9 May 1960. As Archbishop of Reims he attended the Second Vatican Council. He was elected vice-president of the Episcopal Conference of France from 31 May 1966 to 26 May 1969 and was then elected its president, serving until 24 October 1975. He was transferred to the metropolitan see of Paris in March 1968.

== Cardinalate ==
He was created a cardinal and appointed Cardinal-Priest of San Luigi dei Francesi by Pope Paul VI in the consistory of 28 April 1969. He took part in the conclaves that elected Pope John Paul I and Pope John Paul II. He resigned the pastoral government of the archdiocese, 31 January 1981. He lost the right to participate in any further conclaves when turned 80 years of age in 1984. He died on 16 February 1994 in a car and train accident.

After the first meeting between Church and Freemasonry which had been held on 11 April 1969 at the convent of the Divine Master in Ariccia, he was the protagonist of a series of public handshakes between high prelates of the Roman Catholic Church and the heads of Freemasonry.

Catholic Church titles
Preceded by Luigi Agostino Marmottin	Archbishop of Reims; 1960–1968	Succeeded by Émile André Jean-Marie Maury
Preceded by Pierre Veuillot	Archbishop of Paris; 1968–1981	Succeeded by Jean-Marie Lustiger
