= Jean-Pierre Grallet =

Jean-Pierre Grallet O.F.M.
- Archbishop Emeritus of Strasbourg
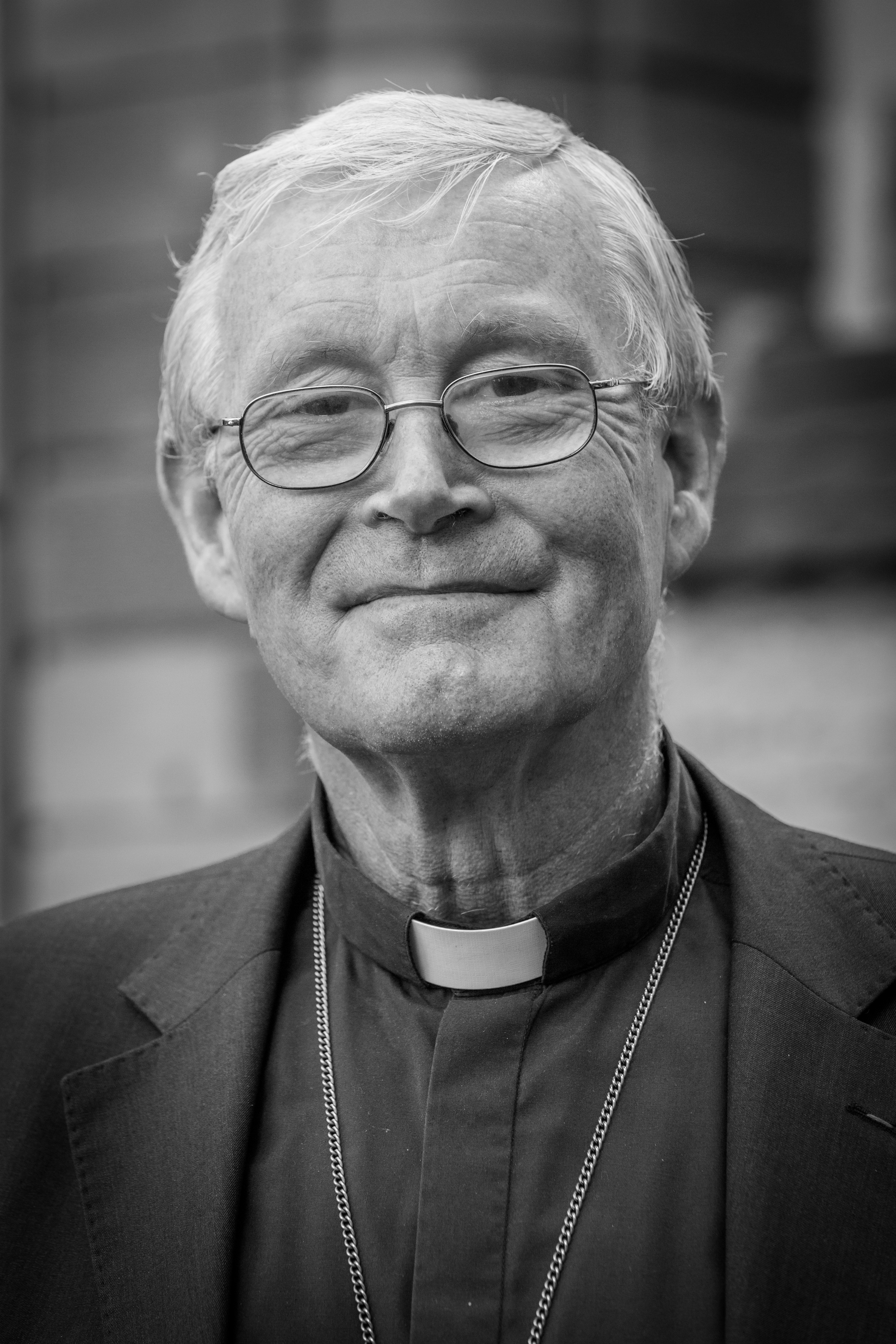
- Grallet in 2014
- Church: Catholic Church
- Archdiocese: Archdiocese of Strasbourg
- In office: 21 April 2007 – 18 February 2017
- Predecessor: Joseph Doré
- Successor: Luc Ravel
- Previous posts: Titular Bishop of Dardanus (2004-2007); Auxiliary Bishop of Strasbourg (2004-2007)

Orders
- Ordination: 28 June 1969
- Consecration: 23 October 2004 by Joseph Doré

Personal details
- Born: 20 May 1941 (age 85) Rozelieures, Zone interdite, Occupied France

Jean-Pierre Grallet O.F.M. (born 20 May 1941) is a French prelate of the Catholic Church who was archbishop of Strasbourg from 2007 to 2017. He was auxiliary bishop there from 2004 to 2007.

He is currently under investigation by both civil and church authorities for sexual abuse of an adult woman in the 1980s; he has admitted his behavior was inappropriate and expressed regret.

== Biography ==
Grallet was born on 20 May 1941 in Rozelieures in Lorraine. He studied at the minor and major seminaries of Nancy. After entering the Order of Friars Minor, he continued his theological formation at the Orsay School of Theology of the Franciscan Province of Paris. He made his solemn vows as a Franciscan on 15 September 1968 and was ordained a priest on 28 June 1969. He obtained a degree in history from the University of Besançon.

Within the Franciscans he was: Custos (1973–1985); Provincial Definitor (1976–1985); master of temporary professed (1985–1988); provincial vicar (1985–1988 and 1996–1999); provincial minister (1988–1996); visitor general (1986, 1988 and 1996); Superior of the Convent of the Franciscan Friars Minor of Strasbourg (1999). He was also in Phalsbourg, educator-chaplain at the "Collège Saint-Antoine" from 1969 to 1972; chaplain of the "Pelante" high school and of the students of the University of Besançon, as well as professor of Church history in the major seminary of Dijon from 1972 to 1985; chaplain of the students in Strasbourg from 1985 to 1988; student chaplain in Metz from 1988 to 1996.

Pope John Paul II named him auxiliary bishop of Strasbourg on 27 September 2004. He received his episcopal consecration on 23 October. Pope Benedict XVI named him archbishop there on 21 April 2007 and he was installed there on 13 May.

Pope Francis accepted his resignation as archbishop on 18 February 2017.

== Admission of sexual abuse ==
On 16 November 2022, Grallet published a statement admitting that at the end of the 1980s, he had made "inappropriate gestures" (gestes déplacés) towards a young adult woman and that he deeply regretted his actions.

According to his successor, Luc Ravel, the events occurred in the fall of 1985 and were brought to his attention by the victim in December 2021 and he reported them to the Strasbourg public prosecutor in January 2022. He said he had notified Vatican authorities as well.

Michel Laloux, provincial of the Franciscans of France and Belgium, reported that by 30 September 2022 a canonical procedure was under way and that on 4 November he had suspended Grallet from his current assignment supervising a retirement home for Franciscans.
