= Antoine de Romanet =

French Catholic bishop

His Excellency Antoine de Romanet
- Bishop of the French Armed Forces
- Church: Roman Catholic Church
- Diocese: Diocese of the French Armed Forces
- Predecessor: Luc Ravel

Orders
- Ordination: 24 June 1995
- Consecration: 10 September 2017 by André Vingt-Trois

Personal details
- Born: 25 October 1962 (age 63) Le Mans, France
- Parents: Luc de Romanet de Beaune; Anne Marie Lafont
- Coat of arms

Antoine de Romanet de Beaune (born 25 October 1962) is a French Catholic prelate. Since 2017 he has served as Bishop of the French Armed Forces.

== Early life and family ==
Antoine de Romanet de Beaune was born on 25 October 1962 in Le Mans to Luc de Romanet de Beaune and Anne Marie Lafont. His family is from Saint-Martin-du-Vieux-Bellême, Orne and are part of the French nobility. He is the younger brother of the businessman and political adviser Augustin de Romanet de Beaune. De Romanet also has two younger siblings, Louis and Jeanne-Marie, who are a Catholic priest and a Benedictine religious sister.

== Education ==
De Romanet studied at Saint-Grégoire College in Tours and at Lycée Montaigne in Paris. He graduated from the Paris Institute of Political Studies in 1983, later obtaining a doctorate in economics in 1989. From 1986 to 1987 he worked as an assistant to the commercial attaché at the French Embassy in Cairo.

In 1988 de Romanet began seminary studies in Paris. In 1992 he switched to the French seminary in Rome, graduating in 1996 from the Pontifical Gregorian University with a degree in moral theology.

== Ecclesiastical career ==
He was ordained a priest for the Archdiocese of Paris on 24 June 1995. From 1996 to 2000 he worked as the vicar of the parish Notre-Dame-de-l'Assomption and chaplain of Lycée Molière in the 16th arrondissement of Paris. In 2000 de Romanet was appointed chaplain general of the Collège Stanislas de Paris, serving in that capacity until 2002. From 2002 to 2010 he was pastor of the parish of Saint-Louis-de-France and the chaplain of Rochambeau French International School in Washington, D.C.

In 2014 he was appointed dean of the Deanery of Auteuil in Paris and co-director of the Department of Politics and Religion at the Collège des Bernardins. De Romanet also taught social ethics at the Seminary of Saint-Sulpice.

On 28 June 2017, he was appointed bishop of the Diocese of the French Armed Forces by Pope Francis, succeeding Luc Ravel. He was consecrated a bishop on 10 September at Notre-Dame de Paris. On 19 October 2019 he officiated at the nuptial mass for Jean-Christophe, Prince Napoléon and Countess Olympia von und zu Arco-Zinneberg at the Cathedral of Saint-Louis des Invalides.
