= Archdiocese of Strasbourg =

Catholic archdiocese in France

Coordinates: 48.5813°N 7.75162°E

Archdiocese of Strasbourg Archidioecesis Argentoratensis, vel Argentinensis Archidiocèse de Strasbourg

Catholic
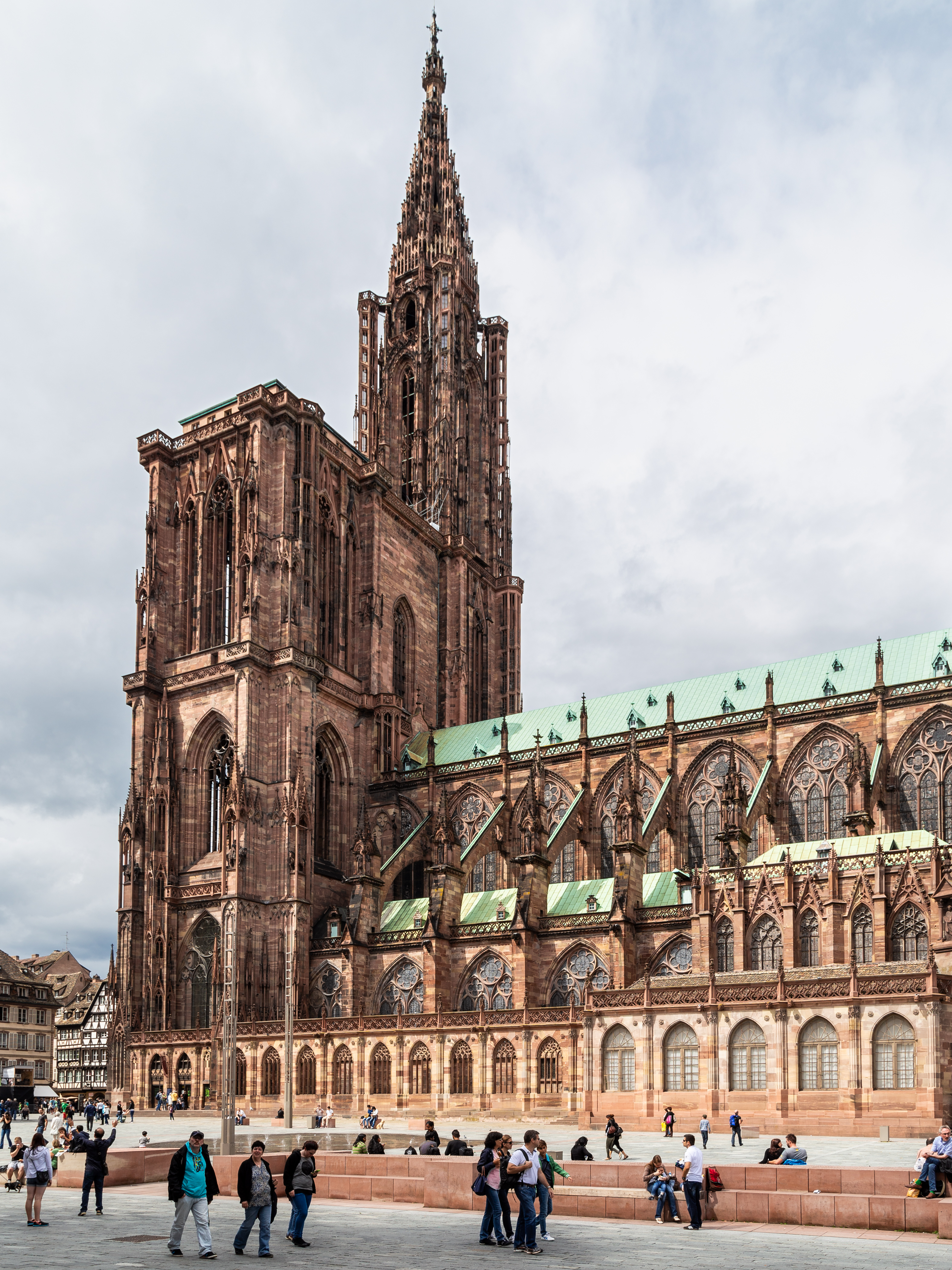
- Cathedral of Notre-Dame, Strasbourg

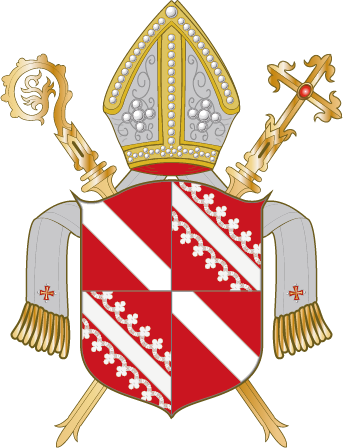
- Coat of arms

Location
- Country: France
- Metropolitan: Immediately subject to the Holy See

Statistics
- Area: 8,280 km^{2} (3,200 sq mi)
- Population: Total; Catholics: (as of 2022); 1,903,000; 1,388,000 (72.9%)
- Parishes: 767

Information
- Denomination: Catholic Church
- Sui iuris church: Latin Church
- Rite: Roman Rite
- Established: 4th century (Diocese); 1 June 1988 (Archdiocese)
- Cathedral: Cathedral of Notre Dame in Strasbourg
- Patron saint: Saint Arbogast
- Secular priests: 328 (Diocesan) ▼156 (Religious Orders) ▼88 Permanent Deacons ▲

Current leadership
- Pope: Leo XIV
- Archbishop: Pascal Delannoy
- Auxiliary Bishops: Christian Kratz
- Bishops emeritus: Joseph Doré; Jean-Pierre Grallet; Luc Ravel

Map

Website
- Official website

The Archdiocese of Strasbourg (Latin: Archidioecesis Argentoratensis o Argentinensis; French: Archidiocèse de Strasbourg; German: Erzbistum Straßburg; Alsatian: Ärzbischofsìtz Strossburi(g)) is a Latin Church ecclesiastical territory or archdiocese of the Catholic Church in France, first mentioned in 343 AD.

It is one of nine archbishoprics in France that has no suffragan dioceses. It is the only archdiocese which is exempt and not within the ecclesiastical province of a metropolitan.

The current archbishop is Pascal Delannoy, who was installed on 21 April 2024.

== History ==
The Diocese of Strasbourg was first mentioned in connection with a council held in Cologne c. 346, summoned to depose its archbishop. The document reporting the council has been attacked as a forgery, and it has been argued that there was no such council. Archeological diggings below the current Saint Stephen's Church, Strasbourg (Saint-Étienne) in 1948 and 1956 have unearthed the apse of a church dating back to the late 4th or early 5th century, considered the oldest church in Alsace. It is supposed that this was the first seat of the diocese.

Since Carolingian times, the diocese belonged to the ecclesiastical province of the Archbishopric of Mainz.

On 20 April 742, the Austraasian Mayor of the Palace Carloman, son of Charles Martel, held a council of his bishops and lay leaders. It was presided over by the papal legate, Archbishop Boniface of Mainz, and among the participants was Bishop Eddo (Heddo, Eddanus) of Strasbourg.

The bishop also was the ruler of an ecclesiastical principality (prince-bishopric) in the Holy Roman Empire during the Middle Ages and Early Modern period until the Reichsdeputationshauptschluss (1803). He held the title of Count already in Carolingian times. The right to coin money was granted to the bishops by Charlemagne, and renewed by Louis the German in 873, by Otto II in 974, and by Otto III in 988.

There had been such strife between Bishop Baldramus (888–906) and the people (plebs) of Strasbourg that King Louis had been forced to pay the city a visit in 905, and negotiate a concord. Under the new bishop, Otbertus (906–913), the strife returned, and, in 912, the bishop was driven out of the city and took refuge in Rotburg, while laying Strasbourg under his interdict. A plot was formed to get rid of Otbertus entirely, and on 30 August 913 he was murdered.

The cathedral of Strasbourg was destroyed by fire on 24 June 1007. Parts of the cathedral and its buildings were damaged by a fire in 1130. The nave was completed at the end of the 13th century. Bishop Conrad de Lichtenberg (1273–1299) began the west front of the cathedral, whose tower was completed in 1439. Since the 15th century, the diocesan seat has been the Cathedral of Notre-Dame de Strasbourg.

According to the "Chroniken von Closener und Königshoven," Pope Leo IX visited Strasbourg, in 1049.

Bishop Jean de Manderscheid (1568–1592) established a college in Molsheim in 1580, and staffed it with Jesuits, for which he received a letter of congratulations and encouragement from Pope Gregory XIII, dated 4 March 1581. Strasbourg by that time was in the hands of the Protestants, and the college was an element in the bishop's counter-attack. It became a university in 1617.

=== Annexation of Strasbourg ===
In 1674, King Louis XIV launched his Rheinland campaign, under the leadership of Marshal Turenne. In a countermove, the Imperial Field Marshal Alexander von Bournonville seized Strasbourg on 24 September, even though Strasbourg was neutral; following the indecisive Battle of Turckheim, the Imperial forces were forced to retreat. In 1681, Alsace was occupied the forces of King Louis XIV, and through the Chambers of Reunion annexed to France. The king made his formal entry into Strasbourg on 30 September 1681.

=== Seminary ===
Guillaume-Egon de Furstenberg was unanimously elected bishop of Strasbourg by the cathedral Chapter, meeting at Severne, on 8 June 1682. On 25 July 1683, at the insistence of Louis XIV, the Society of Jesus formally agreed to establish a seminary in Strasbourg. Letters patent were issued by the king, and the royal treasury undertook to support the cost of 28 seminarians (20 Alsatians and eight French); the bishop and Chapter undertook to provide for 8. The whole, except for the 12 Jesuits in residence, was under the jurisdiction of the bishop, who chose each of the seminarian candidates, though practical administration was in the hands of a rector. The French bishops consulted by Bishop Furstenberg had indicated a preference for the staffing by Oratorians, but the king himself disliked their Jansenist tendencies and insisted on the Jesuits. The arrangements continued until the expulsion of the Jesuits from France in 1762.

The cathedral of Strasbourg was taken from the Protestants and returned to the bishop and cathedral Chapter on 23 October 1681.

The diocese of Strasbourg seems not to have been a suffragan (subordinate) of the archdiocese of Mainz in Germany at the end of the ancien regime. Jean indicates that Strasbourg was certainly a suffragan of Mainz before the annexation by Louis XIV.

=== French Revolution ===
On 2 November 1789, the National Assembly proclaimed that all ecclesiastical property was confiscated by the State.

Even before it directed its attention to the Church directly, the National Constituent Assembly attacked the institution of monasticism. On 13 February 1790. it issued a decree which stated that the government would no longer recognize solemn religious vows taken by either men or women. In consequence, Orders and Congregations which lived under a Rule were suppressed in France. Members of either sex were free to leave their monasteries or convents if they wished, and could claim an appropriate pension by applying to the local municipal authority.

The National Constituent Assembly ordered the replacement of political subdivisions of the ancien régime with subdivisions called "departments", to be characterized by a single administrative city in the center of a compact area. The decree was passed on 22 December 1789, and the boundaries fixed on 26 February 1790, with the effective date of 4 March 1790. A new department was created called "Bas-Rhin," and Strasbourg became the administrative city in the department.

The National Constituent Assembly then, on 6 February 1790, instructed its ecclesiastical committee to prepare a plan for the reorganization of the clergy. At the end of May, its work was presented as a draft Civil Constitution of the Clergy, which, after vigorous debate, was approved on 12 July 1790. There was to be one diocese in each department, requiring the suppression of approximately fifty dioceses. The diocese of Bas-Rhin (Strasbourg) was named the diocese of the department of Bas-Rhin, and its seat fixed at Strasbourg. A new metropolitanate was created, the "Métropole de l'Est," with its metropolitan seated in Besançon. Bas-Rhin (Strasbourg) was one of its suffragans.

The Civil Constitution of the Clergy also abolished Chapters, canonries, prebends, and other offices both in cathedras and in collegiate churches. It also abolished chapters in abbeys and priories of either sex, whether regular or secular.

The Bishop of Strasbourg, Cardinal Louis de Rohan-Guéméné, in 1791 refused to swear the oath of allegiance to the Civil Constitution of the Clergy, and the French government consequently declared his bishopric to be vacant. In February 1791, therefore, an electoral assembly, composed two-thirds of Protestants, met in Strasbourg and elected the former rector of the seminary, François-Antoine Brendel, as their constitutional bishop. Cardinal de Rohan protested its uncanonical and schismatic attempt to elect a successor, and went into exile at Ettenheim on the east side of the Rhine.

=== Restoration ===
The French Directory fell in the coup engineered by Talleyrand and Napoleon on 10 November 1799. The coup resulted in the establishment of the French Consulate, with Napoleon as the First Consul. To advance his aggressive military foreign policy, he decided to make peace with the Catholic Church and the Papacy. In the concordat of 1801 between the French Consulate, headed by First Consul Napoleon Bonaparte, and Pope Pius VII, and in the enabling papal bull, "Qui Christi Domini", the constitutional diocese of Bas-Rhin and all the other dioceses in France, were suppressed. This removed all the institutional contaminations and novelties introduced by the Constitutional Church. The diocesan structure was then re-established by the papal bull "Qui Christi Domini" of 29 November 1801, including the diocese of Strasbourg. The Concordat was registered as a French law on 8 April 1802.

By the Concordat of 1801, the Diocese of Strasbourg became a public-law corporation of cult (French: établissement public du culte), and the territory of the diocese of Strasbourg was redrawn: it gained territory from the Diocese of Basel (Switzerland), the Diocese of Metz and the Diocese of Speyer (Germany).

After 1821, all its areas east of the river Rhine were assigned to the Archdiocese of Freiburg. On 25 February 1803 it lost territory to the Diocese of Konstanz, on 26 April 1808 it gained territory from the same and in 1815 lost territory to that Diocese of Konstanz.

In 1871 the bulk of the diocese became part of German Empire, while small fringes remained with France. On 10 July 1874 Strasbourg diocese, with its diocesan ambit reconfined to the borders of then German Alsace, gaining territory from the Diocese of Saint-Dié, and losing territory to the Metropolitan Archdiocese of Besançon, and it became an exempt diocese, immediately subject to the Holy See instead of part of any ecclesiastical province. When the 1905 French law on the Separation of the Churches and the State was enacted, doing away with public-law religious corporations, this did not apply to the Strasbourg diocese which was then within Germany.

After World War I, Alsace along with the diocese was returned to France, but the status from the concordat has been preserved as part of the Local law in Alsace-Moselle.

This maintenance of the Concordat gives to the Catholic cult in Alsace-Moselle a totally different status from the rest of France since the 1905 French law separating the State from the church in all the rest of the country. One of the key differences is that the French State participates to the nomination of the archbishops and pays "a decent salary" for the bishops and the clergymen in Alsace-Moselle. The officially recognized religious cults in this Concordat also include Protestantism and Judaism on top of Catholicism.

The diocese was elevated to Archdiocese of Strasbourg on 1 June 1988 by Pope John Paul II. The diocese is not subject to a metropolitan of an ecclesiastical province, but remains directly dependent upon the Holy See. The bishop of this see is appointed by the French president according to the Concordat of 1801. The concordat further provides for the clergy to be paid by the government and Catholic pupils in public schools can receive religious instruction according to archdiocesan guidelines.

It enjoyed papal visits from Pope John Paul II in October 1988 and Pope Francis in November 2014.

On 27 May 2023, Pope Francis accepted the resignation of most recent Archbishop Luc Ravel.

== Cathedral and basilicas ==
The archiepiscopal cathedral seat is the Cathedral of Notre Dame (Our Lady) in Strasbourg. It is a World Heritage Site.

The diocese contains four other Minor Basilicas, two in each of the former Alsace region's departments:

- Basilique du Sacré-Cœur (Sacred Heart) in Lutterbach, Haut-Rhin
- Basilique Notre-Dame de Marienthal, Bas-Rhin
- Basilique Notre-Dame de Thierenbach, in Jungholtz, Haut-Rhin
- Basilique Notre-Dame du Mont Sainte-Odile in Ottrott, Bas-Rhin.

== Statistics ==
As per 2014, it pastorally served 1,380,000 Catholics (74.9% of 1,843,000 total) on 8,280 km^{2} in 767 parishes and 5 missions with 722 priests (517 diocesan, 205 religious), 80 deacons, 1,332 lay religious (282 brothers, 1,050 sisters) and 17 seminarians.As of 31 December 2003, the area of the archdiocese comprised a total of 1,713,416 inhabitants of which 75.9% (1,300,000) are Catholics, divided in 762 parishes covering an area of 8,280 km^{2}. Also, 619 diocese priests, 50 deacons, 288 ordained priests and 1,728 nuns belonged to the archdiocese.

== Bishops and archbishops ==
=== To 1000 ===
- Amandus (c. 346)

...

- Ansoaldus (614)

...

- Rotharius (7th cent.)

...

- Widigernus (728)
- Wandalfridus
- Heddo (c. 737 – c. 776)
- Remigius (776–783)
- Rachio (783–c. 815)
- Uto
- Erlehard (d. 817)
- Adaloch (817–821)
- Bernold (c. 821–840)
- Ratoldus (852–874)
- Reginhardus (874–888)
- Baldramus (888–906)
- Otbertus (906–913)
- Gozfridus (913–916)
- Richewin (916–933)
- Ruthard (933–950)
- Uton (Utho) (950–965)
- Erchenbald (965–991)
- Widerold (991–999)

=== 1000 to 1300 ===
- Amawich (999 – 1001.02.03)
- Werner of Bavaria (Werner von Hapsburg) (1002 – 1028.10.28)
- Wilhelm (1029 – 1047)
- Hezelon (1047–1065)
- Werner (Werner von Achalm) (1065–1079)
- Thiepald (Teobaldo) (1079–1084)
- Otton de Hohenstaufen (Otto von Büren) (1085 – 1100.08.03)
- Balduin (Baldovino, Baldwin) (1100–1100)
- Cunon (Conrad) (1100–1123)
- Bruno(n) (1123–1126)
- Eberhard (1126–1127)
- Bruno de Hohenberg (1129 – 1131)
- Gebhard (1131–1141)
- Burchard (1141 – 1162)
- Rudolf (1162–1179)

[ Conrad de Geroldseck (1179 – 1180) ]

- Henri de Hasebourg (1181 – 1190)
- Conrad de Hunebourg (1190 – 1202)
- Henri de Veringen (1202–1223)
- Berthold de Teck (1223–1244)
- Henri de Stahleck (1245–1260)
- Walther von Geroldseck (1260–1263)
- Henri de Geroldseck (1263–1273)
- Conrad de Lichtenberg (1273–1299)

=== 1300 to 1600 ===
- Frédéric de Lichtenberg (1299–1305)
- Jean de Dirpheim (1306–1328)
- Berthold de Bucheck, O.T. (1328–1353)
- Jean de Lichtenberg (1353 – 14 September 1365)
- Jean de Luxembourg-Ligny (1366 – 4 April 1371)
- Lamprecht von Brunn (28 April 1371 – 20 April 1374)
- Frederik van Blankenheim (1375–1393)

[Ludwig von Thierstein (1393, not confirmed) ]

- [ Burchard von Lützelstein (1393–1394) ]
- Wilhelm von Diest (1394–1439)
  - Egidio von Byderborch, O. Carm. Auxiliary Bishop (1428– ? )
- Conrad von Busnang (1439–1440)
- Rupertus von Simmern (1440–1478)
  - Auxiliary Bishop: Hermann (1447 – death 1455)
- Albert of Bavaria (1478–1506)
- Wilhelm von Hohenstein (1506 – 1541)
- Érasme de Limbourg (1541 – 27 November 1568)
- Jean de Manderscheid (1568 – death 22 April 1592)

Jean Georges de Brandebourg, Administrator (1592 – retired 1604) Protestant layman

- Cardinal Charles de Lorraine-Vaudémont (1592–1607) Administrator
  - Adam Petz, Auxiliary Bishop (1605–1626)

=== 1600 to 2000 ===
- Leopold V, Archduke of Austria (1607–1626)
- Archduke Leopold Wilhelm of Austria (1626–1662)
  - Paulus Aldringen Auxiliary Bishop (1627–1644)
- Franz Egon of Fürstenberg (1663 – 1682)
- Wilhelm Egon von Fürstenberg (8 June 1682 -1704)
  - Johann Peter von Quentell, Auxiliary Bishop (1698–1699)
- Armand-Gaston-Maximilien de Rohan de Soubise (1704–1749)
  - Guillaume Tual Auxiliary Bishop (1715–1716)
  - Louis Philippe d'Auneau de Visé Auxiliary Bishop: (1719–1729)
  - Jean Vivant, Auxiliary Bishop: (1730 – 1739)
  - Johann Franz Riccius, Auxiliary Bishop: (1739 – 1756)
- François-Armand-Auguste de Rohan-Soubise-Ventadour (1749–1756)
- Louis César Constantin de Rohan (1756–1779)
  - Toussaint Duvernin, Auxiliary Bishop (1757–1785)
- Louis René Édouard de Rohan-Guéméné (1779–1801)
  - Jean Jacques Lantz, Auxiliary Bishop
- Jean-Pierre Saurine (9 April 1802 - death 7 May 1813)
- Gustave-Maximilien-Juste de Croÿ-Solre (1817–1823)
- Claude-Marie-Paul Tharin (1823–1826)
- Jean-François-Marie Le Pappe de Trévern (1826–1842)
  - Denis-Auguste Affre. Coadjutor Bishop-elect (1840, April–May)
- Andreas (André) Räß (Raess) (1842–1887)
- Apostolic Administrator Pierre-Paul Stumpf (1883–1887)
- Pierre-Paul Stumpf (see above 17 November 1887 - death 10 August 1890)
- Adolf Fritzen (1891–1919)
  - Charles Marbach, Auxiliary Bishop (1891–1901)
  - Franz Zorn von Bulach, Auxiliary Bishop (1901–1919)
- Charles-Joseph-Eugène Ruch (1919–1945)
- Jean-Julien Weber, P.S.S. (1945–1966)
- Léon-Arthur-Auguste Elchinger (1966–1984)
  - Roger Joseph Heckel, S.J., Coadjutor Bishop (1980–1982)
- Charles Amarin Brand (1984–1988–1997)
  - Léon Hégelé, Auxiliary Bishop (1985–2000)

=== Archbishops of Strasbourg ===
- Charles Amarin Brand, Archbishop-bishop (1984–1988–1997)
- Joseph Pierre Aimé Marie Doré, P.S.S. (1997–2006)
- Jean-Pierre Grallet, O.F.M. (2007–2017)
  - Vincent Jordy, Auxiliary Bishop (2008–2011)
- Luc Ravel, C.R.S.V. (2017.02.18 – 2023.05.27), previously Military Ordinary of France (2009.10.07 – 2017.02.18).
- Pascal Delannoy (2024.4.21 - present)

== Gallery ==
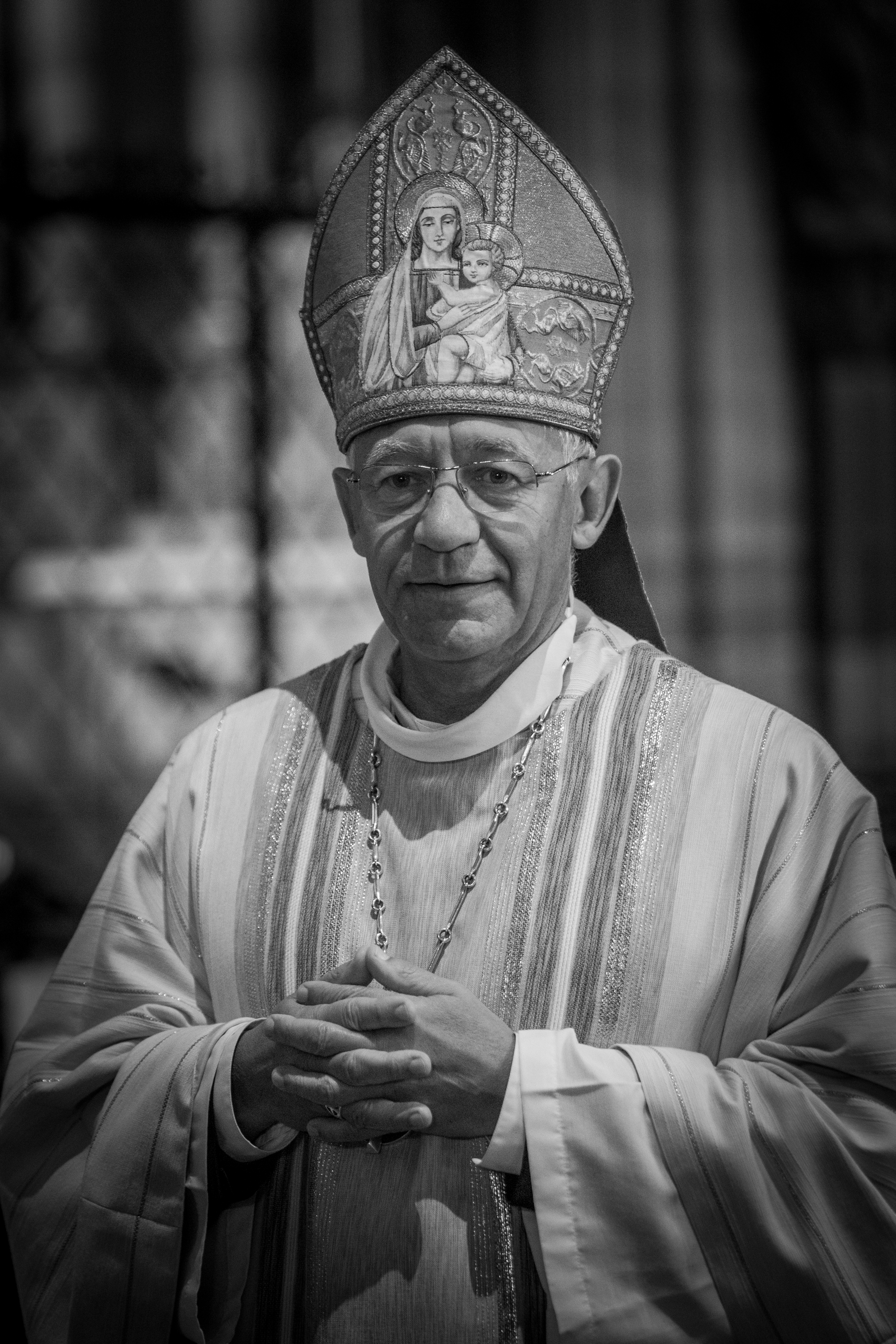
Former archbishop
Luc Ravel

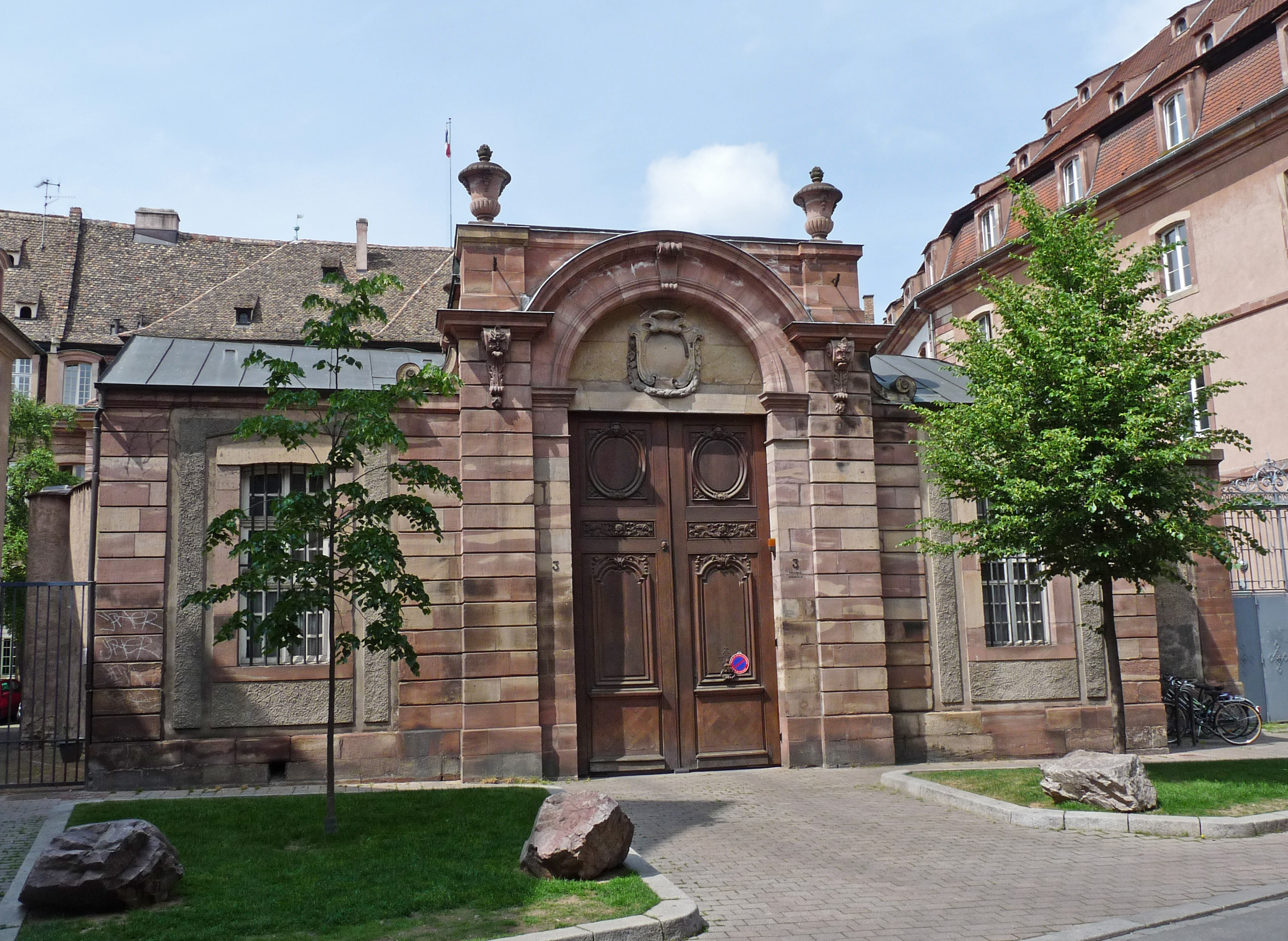
Grand portal of Episcopal Palace

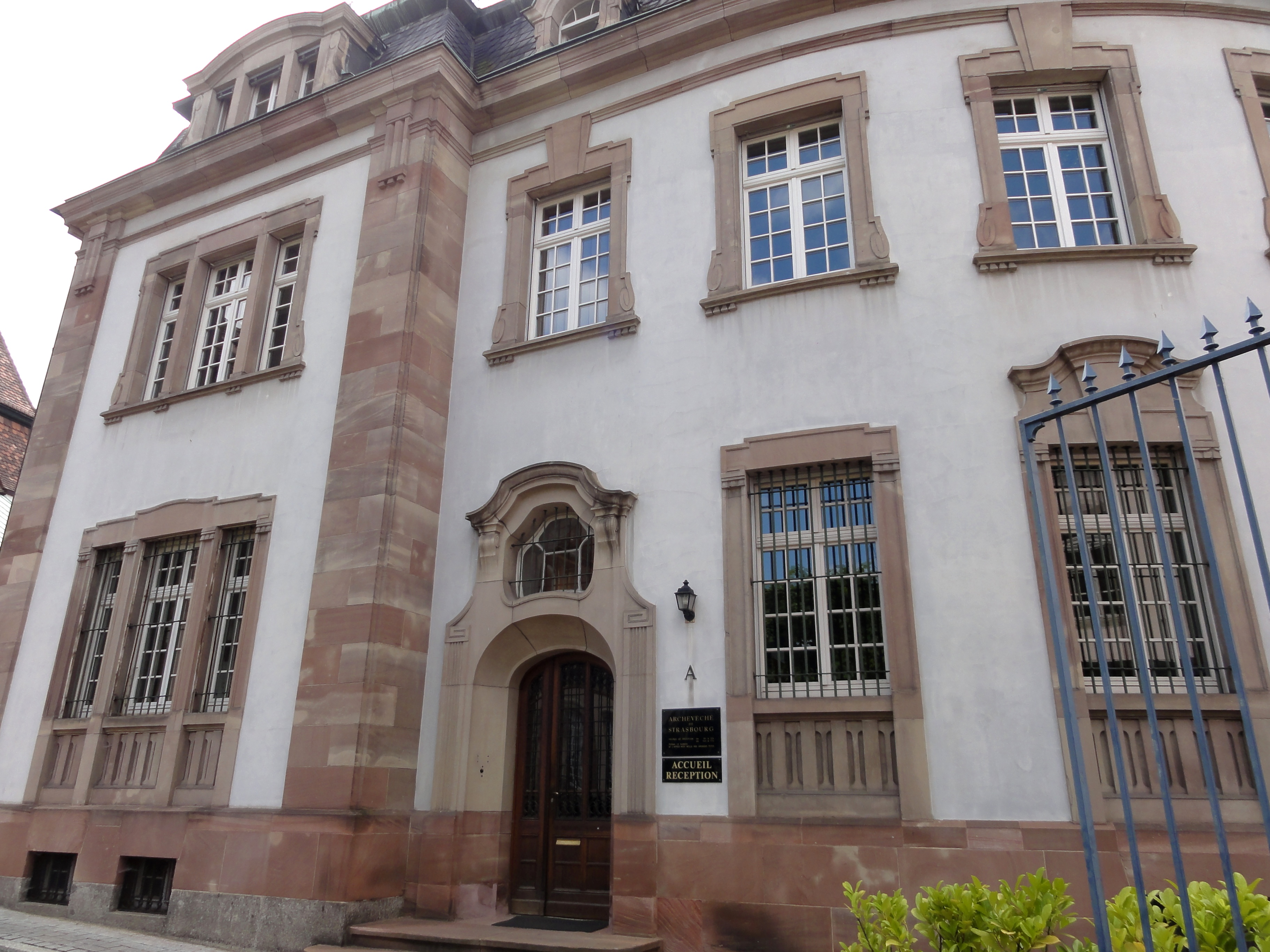
Secondary building of Episcopal Palace

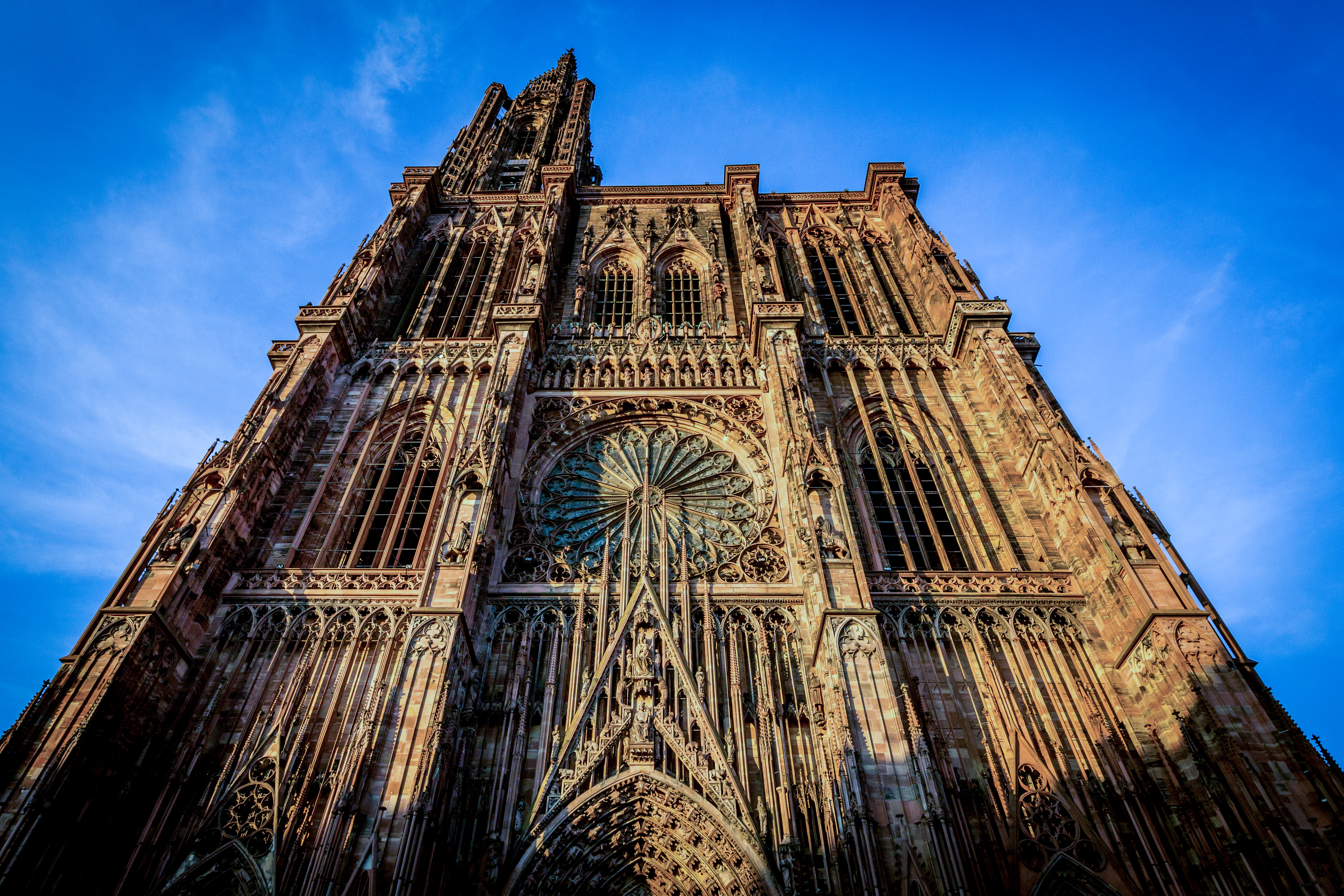
Strasbourg Cathedral

== See also ==
- List of Catholic dioceses in France
- List of basilicas in France
- Aurelia of Strasbourg
- Catholic Church in France

== Books ==
=== Episcopal lists and notes ===
- Eubel, Conradus, ed. (1913). Hierarchia catholica (in Latin). Vol. Tomus 1 (second ed.). Münster: Libreria Regensbergiana.
- Eubel, Conradus, ed. (1914). Hierarchia catholica (in Latin). Vol. Tomus 2 (second ed.). Münster: Libreria Regensbergiana.
- Eubel, Conradus; Gulik, Guilelmus, eds. (1923). Hierarchia catholica (in Latin). Vol. Tomus 3 (second ed.). Münster: Libreria Regensbergiana.
- Gauchat, Patritius (Patrice) (1935). Hierarchia catholica. Vol. Tomus IV (1592-1667). Münster: Libraria Regensbergiana. (in Latin)
- Ritzler, Remigius; Sefrin, Pirminus (1952). Hierarchia catholica medii et recentis aevi V (1667-1730). Patavii: Messagero di S. Antonio.
- Ritzler, Remigius; Sefrin, Pirminus (1958). Hierarchia catholica medii et recentis aevi. Vol. Tomus VI (1730-1799). Patavii: Messagero di S. Antonio. (in Latin)
- Ritzler, Remigius; Sefrin, Pirminus (1968). Hierarchia Catholica medii et recentioris aevi sive summorum pontificum, S. R. E. cardinalium, ecclesiarum antistitum series... A pontificatu Pii PP. VII (1800) usque ad pontificatum Gregorii PP. XVI (1846) (in Latin). Vol. VII. Monasterii: Libr. Regensburgiana.
- Remigius Ritzler; Pirminus Sefrin (1978). Hierarchia catholica Medii et recentioris aevi... A Pontificatu PII PP. IX (1846) usque ad Pontificatum Leonis PP. XIII (1903) (in Latin). Vol. VIII. Il Messaggero di S. Antonio.
- Pięta, Zenon (2002). Hierarchia catholica medii et recentioris aevi... A pontificatu Pii PP. X (1903) usque ad pontificatum Benedictii PP. XV (1922) (in Latin). Vol. IX. Padua: Messagero di San Antonio. ISBN 978-88-250-1000-8.

=== Studies ===
- Châtellier, Louis (1981). Tradition chrétienne et renouveau catholique dans l'ancien diocèse de Strasbourg. (in French). Strasbourg and Paris, 1981.
- Châtellier, Louis (1982). Le Diocèse de Strasbourg. (in French) Paris: Beauchesne, 1982.
- Delattre, Pierre (1953). "La Compagnie de Jésus et les séminaires en France," (in French), in: Revue d'Ascétique et de Mystique 20 (1953), pp. 20–44, 160–76.
- Duchesne, Louis (1915). Fastes episcopaux de l'ancienne Gaule. Vol. III: Les provinces du Nord et de l'Est. (in French). Paris: A. Fontemoing, 1915. (pp. 166–174.)
- Grandidier, Philippe-André (1776). Histoire de l'église et des Evêques-Princes de Strasbourg, depuis la fondation de l'évêché jusqu'à nos jours. (in French). Strasbourg: Levrault. Volume 1 1776. Volume 2 1778.
- Grandidier, Philippe-André (1782). Essais historiques et topographiques sur l'église cathédrale de Strasbourg. (in French). Strasbourg: Levrault 1782. Supplement and Appendix 1868.
- Grandidier, Philippe-André (1865). Oeuvres historiques inédites. (in French and Latin). Vol. 1. Colmar 1865. [965-1050]
- Grandidier, Philippe-André (1865). Oeuvres historiques inédites. (in French and Latin). Vol. 2. Colmar 1865. [1028-1176]
- Grandidier, Philippe-André (1865). Oeuvres historiques inédites. (in French and Latin). Volume 3. Colmar: Revue d'Alsace 1865. [1179–1260]
- Grandidier, Philippe-André (1866). Oeuvres historiques inédites. (in French and Latin). Volume 4. Colmar: Revue d'Alsace 1866. [1260–1439]
- Hessel, Alfred; Krebs, Manfred (1924). Regesten der Bischöfe von Strassburg. (in German). Volume 2. Innsbruck: Wagner 1924.
- Jean, Armand (1891). Les évêques et les archevêques de France depuis 1682 jusqu'à 1801 (in French). Paris: A. Picard.. Pp. 244–249.
- Pisani, Paul (1907). Répertoire biographique de l'épiscopat constitutionnel (1791–1802) (in French). Paris: A. Picard et fils.
- Sainte-Marthe, Denis de; Piolin, Paul (1877). Gallia christiana in provincias ecclesiasticas distributa (in Latin). 1st edition (Paris 1731). 2nd edition (Paris: Victor Palmé) Volume 5. Pp. 773-890; "Instrumenta," pp. 458–508.
- Wentzke, Paul (1908). Regesten der Bischöfe von Strassburg. (in German). Volume 1, Parts 1–2. Innsbruck: Wagner 1908. (Part 1 contains the Salzburg Annals, Part 2 contains the Regesten).

=== External links ===
- Herbermann, Charles, ed. (1913). "Strasburg" . Catholic Encyclopedia. New York: Robert Appleton Company.
