= Diocese of the French Armed Forces =

Roman Catholic diocese in France

Coordinates: 48.8559°N 2.3126°E

Diocese of the French Armed Forces Ordinariatus castrensis Galliæ Diocèse aux Armées Françaises

Catholic
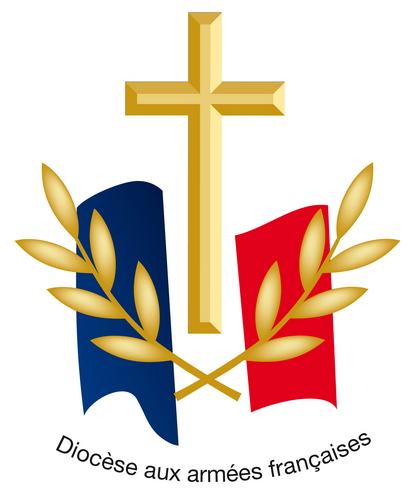

Location
- Country: France
- Territory: The ordinariate extends to all countries where there are Catholic personnel in the French armies.
- Metropolitan: Immediately subject to the Holy See

Information
- Denomination: Catholic Church
- Sui iuris church: Latin Church
- Rite: Roman Rite
- Established: 26 July 1952 (as Vicariate); 21 July 1986 (as Ordinariate)
- Cathedral: Cathedral of Saint-Louis-des-Invalides, Paris
- Secular priests: 101 (Diocesan); 28 (Religious Orders); 9 Permanent Deacons (as of 2021)

Current leadership
- Pope: Leo XIV
- Bishop: Antoine de Romanet

Website
- DioceseAuxArmees.fr

The Diocese of the French Armed Forces (French: Diocèse aux Armées Françaises) is a Latin Church military ordinariate of the Catholic Church. Immediately subject to the Holy See, it provides pastoral care to Catholics serving in the French Armed Forces and their families.

== History ==
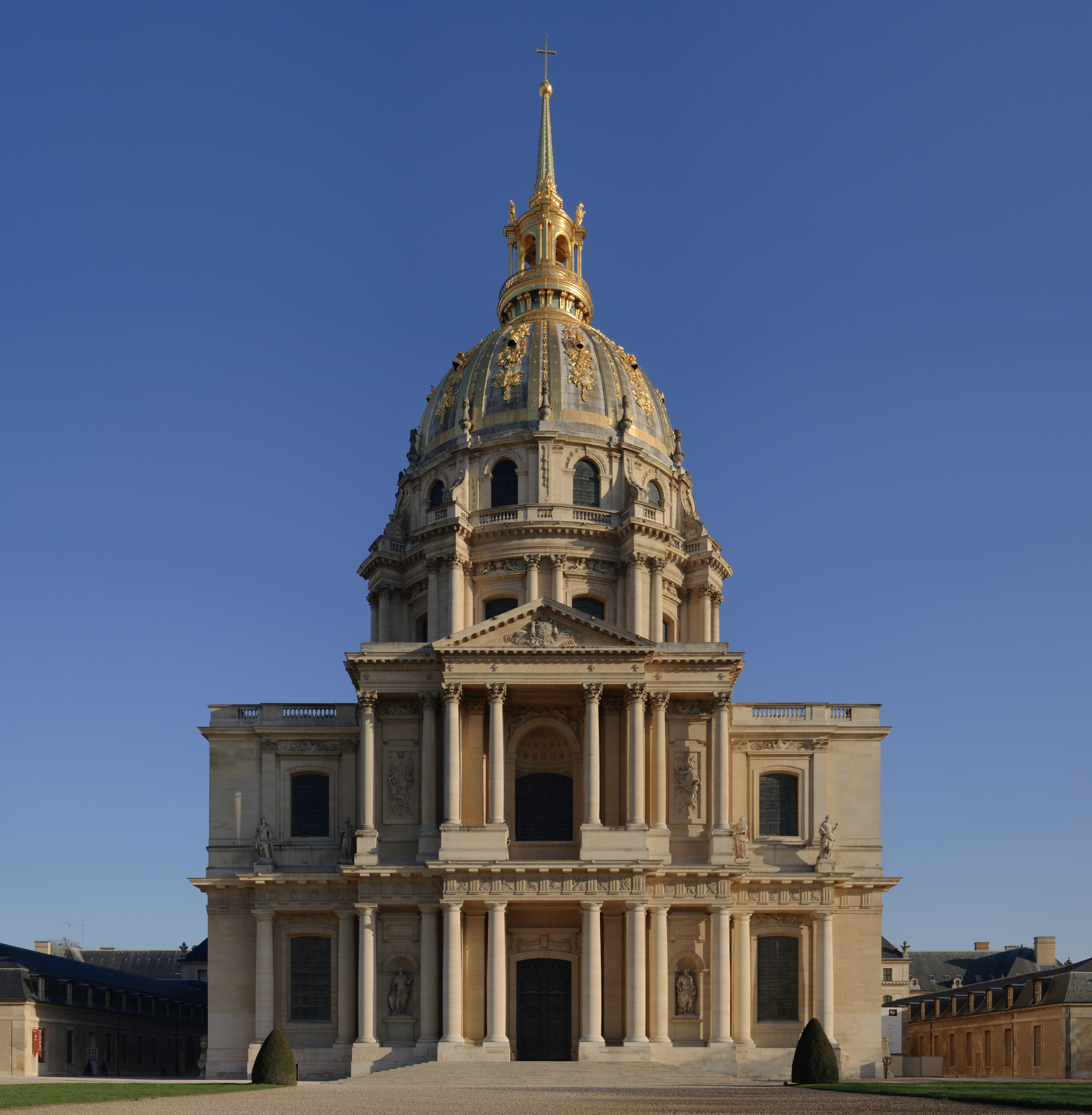
Church of Saint-Louis-des-Invalides in Paris

The post of military bishop was created in 1949, and a military vicariate was established on 26 July 1952. It was elevated to a military ordinariate on 21 July 1986. The cathedra is located at the Church of Saint-Louis-des-Invalides (L'Église Saint-Louis-des-Invalides) in Paris, France.

== Office holders ==
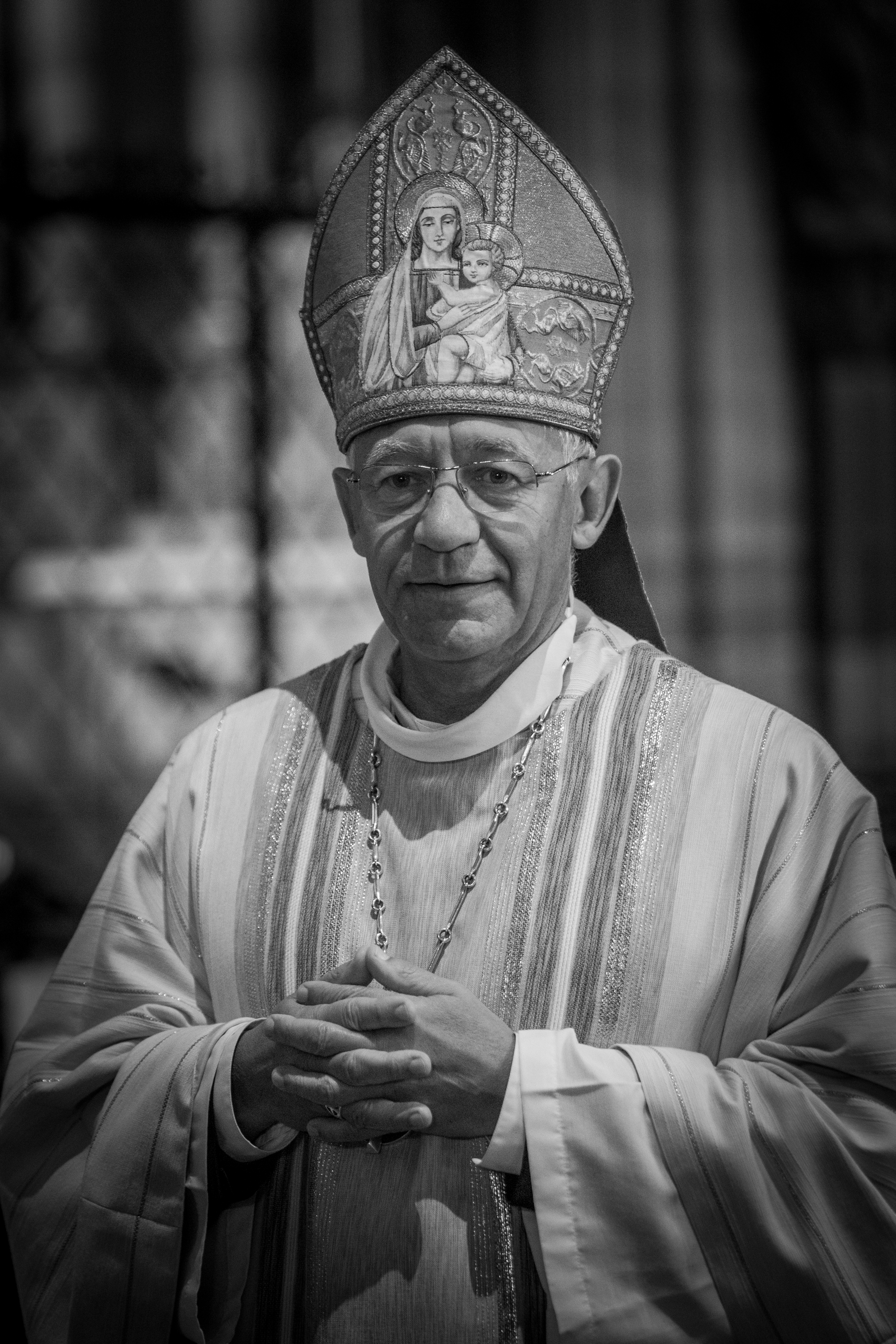
Luc Ravel was bishop of the diocese from 2009 to 2017

=== Military bishops ===
- Maurice Feltin (appointed 29 October 1949 – became military vicar 26 July 1952)

=== Military vicars ===
- Maurice Feltin (appointed 26 July 1952 – retired 15 April 1967)
- Jean-Marie-Clément Badré (appointed 15 May 1967 – translated to the Diocese of Bayeux-Lisieux 10 December 1969)
- Gabriel Vanel (appointed 21 April 1970 – resigned 12 February 1983)
- Jacques Louis Marie Joseph Fihey (appointed 12 February 1983 – became military ordinary 21 July 1986)

=== Military ordinaries ===
- Jacques Louis Marie Joseph Fihey (appointed 21 July 1986 – translated to the Diocese of Countances-Avranches 22 April 1989)
- Michel Marie Jacques Dubost, C.I.M. (appointed 9 August 1989 – translated to the Diocese of Évry–Corbeil-Essonnes 15 April 2000)
- Patrick Le Gal (appointed 23 May 2000 – appointed Auxiliary Bishop of Lyon 7 October 2009)
- Luc Marie Daniel Ravel, C.R.S.V. (appointed 7 October 2009 – translated to the Roman Catholic Archdiocese of Strasbourg, 18 February 2017)
- Antoine de Romanet (appointed 28 June 2017)
