= Augustin de Romanet de Beaune =

French political advisor and business executive

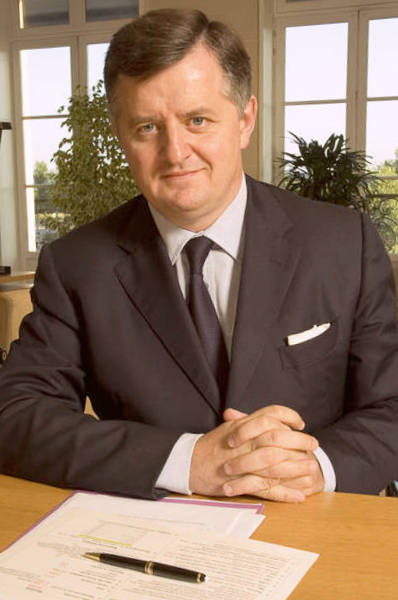
- Augustin de Romanet de Beaune in 2012
- Born: Augustin Pascal Pierre Louis Marie de Romanet de Beaune; 2 April 1961 (age 65); Boulogne-Billancourt, France
- Education: Sciences Po; École nationale d'administration.
- Occupation: Businessman
- Spouse: Florence Marie Évelyne Burin des Roziers
- Children: 3
- Parent(s): Luc de Romanet de Beaune; Anne Marie Lafont

Augustin de Romanet de Beaune (French pronunciation: [oɡystɛ̃ də ʁɔmanɛ də bon]; born 2 April 1961) is a French political advisor and business executive, chief executive officer of Groupe ADP since November 2012. He served as the chairman of the Caisse des dépôts et consignations from 2007 to 2012, and held many government positions between 1986 and 2006.

== Early life and education ==
Augustin de Romanet de Beaune was raised in a Roman Catholic noble family. He is the oldest son of Luc de Romanet de Beaune and Anne Marie de Romanet de Beaune (née Lafont). His family were elevated into the French nobility in the 14th century. He is a brother of the Catholic bishop Antoine de Romanet.

Augustin de Romanet is a graduate of Sciences Po and the École nationale d'administration with the Diderot promotion of 1986.

== Career ==
=== Political advisor ===
Augustin de Romanet de Beaune started his career at the budget directorate of the Minister of Finance. In 1990, he became financial advisor in the French permanent representation to the European Communities in Brussels. In 1993, he is back at the budget directorate.

In 1995, following the election of Jacques Chirac, Augustin de Romanet became technical assistant to finance minister Alain Madelin for a short period, before transferring to François d'Aubert’s secretary of state’s office where he became chief of staff. Then, as financial advisor, he joined the cabinet of Alain Lamassoure in the ministry of budget, followed by a project manager position for finance minister Jean Arthuis. In 1997, he held a vice-director position at the budget directorate.

Augustin de Romanet was cabinet secretary to the Minister of the Budget, Alain Lambert, in 2002, and to the Minister of Employment, Jean-Louis Borloo, in 2004. Later that year, he worked in Prime Minister Jean-Pierre Raffarin's cabinet.

From 11 June 2005 to 13 October 2006, Augustin de Romanet served as deputy secretary general to the presidency of France.

=== Business executive ===
From 1999 to 2002, Augustin de Romanet served as managing partner of Oddo & Cie, a French investment bank.

In 2006, Augustin de Romanet served as head of strategy of Crédit Agricole.

On 7 March 2007 Augustin de Romanet became the chairman of the Caisse des dépôts et consignations, the French state bank that manages €400 billion worth of assets. Through this position, Augustin de Romanet became a board member of many state-controlled companies (Accor, Dexia, Icade, Veolia Environnement, Oséo, La Poste, ...). He served as the chairman of the Fonds stratégique d'investissement, the newly created state-owned investment fund, from November 2008 to March 2012.

He stepped down as Chairman of the Caisse des dépôts in 2012.

On 28 November 2012, Augustin de Romanet became chief executive officer of the French airports operator Groupe ADP, replacing Pierre Graff who retired. In July 2014, the board of Groupe ADP reappointed him for a 5-year tenure. In October 2015, Augustin de Romanet announced ADP’s 2016-2020 strategic plan (Connect 2020), which implies developing the brand of the French airports operator, grow on international markets, and use the Parisian airports as concept stores for the brand. In April 2016, Aéroports de Paris S.A. launched two separate brands : All Paris airports now carry the brand « Paris Aéroport » geared towards travellers and embodying the group’s B2C promises; On the other end, all the logistics and technical activities of the group now carry the brand « Groupe ADP ».

Under his tenure, the CDG Express project was revived. He developed retail partnerships with consumer brands, opening a Victoria’s Secret store and a Carrefour City store at Paris-Orly, where a new business lounge concept was also launched. Paris-Charles de Gaulle’s terminal E2 was turned into a luxury shopping area, and awarded 3rd world’s best airport terminal by Skytrax.

In 2012, when ADP bought 38% of TAV Airports Holding, Augustin de Romanet became vice chairman of the board of the Turkish airports operator.

In October 2015, he was elected president of ACI Europe for a two-year mandate.

== Personal life ==
In March 2020, during the COVID-19 pandemic, he tested positive for the virus.

== Other tenures ==
- 1986-1995: Professor at Sciences Po Paris
- 1989-2006: Member of the city council of Bellême (Orne)
- 1992-1995: Professor at ENA
- Since March 2011 : Board member of Louvre-Lens museum
- Since July 2014 : Board member of RATP
- Since March 2015 : Board member of SCOR

== Awards ==
- 2007: Chevalier of the Légion d'honneur (France)
- 2008: Capitalist of the year, by Le Nouvel Économiste
- 2012: Financier of the year, by the Minister of finances (France)

== See also ==
- Caisse des dépôts et consignations
- Groupe ADP
- Louvre-Lens museum
