= Olivier de Berranger =

French Roman Catholic bishop

Olivier de Berranger Ist. del Prado
- Bishop of Saint-Denis
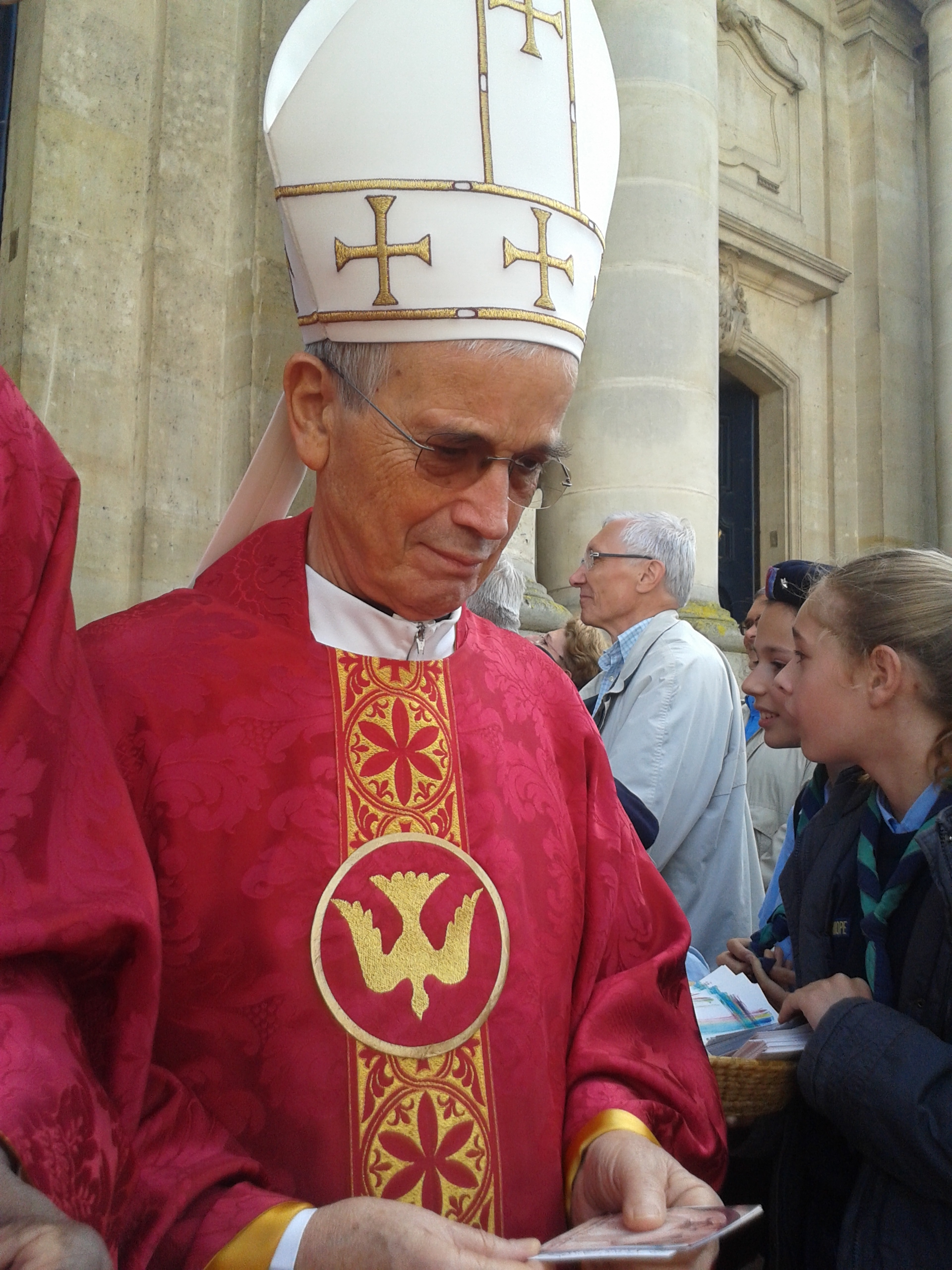
- Olivier de Berranger, 2014
- Church: Catholic Church
- Diocese: Diocese of Saint-Denis
- In office: 6 September 1996 – 15 January 2009
- Predecessor: Guy Deroubaix
- Successor: Pascal Delannoy

Orders
- Ordination: 4 July 1964
- Consecration: 19 October 1996 by Jean-Marie Lustiger

Personal details
- Born: 10 November 1938 Courbevoie, Paris, France
- Died: 23 May 2017 (aged 78) Le Chesnay, Yvelines, France

Olivier de Berranger (10 November 1938 – 23 May 2017) was a Roman Catholic bishop.

Ordained to the priesthood in 1964, de Berranger served as bishop of the Roman Catholic Diocese of Saint-Denis, France from 1996 until 2009.
