= Diocese of Saint-Denis =

Catholic diocese in France

Coordinates: 48.935°N 2.35793°E

Diocese of Saint-Denis in France Dioecesis Sancti Dionysii in Francia Diocèse de Saint-Denis en France

Catholic
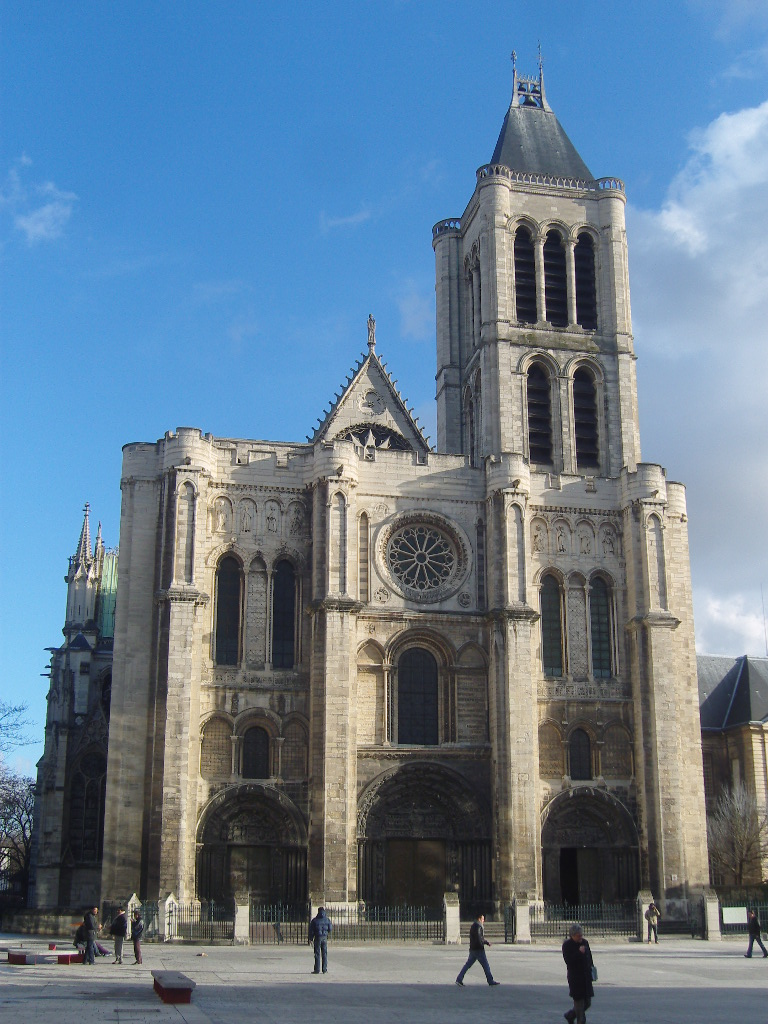
- Cathedral Basilica of Saint-Denis

Location
- Country: France
- Ecclesiastical province: Paris
- Metropolitan: Archdiocese of Paris

Statistics
- Area: 236 km^{2} (91 sq mi)
- Population: Total; Catholics: (as of 2022); 1,654,000; 717,000 (43.3%)
- Parishes: 85

Information
- Denomination: Roman Catholic
- Sui iuris church: Latin Church
- Rite: Roman Rite
- Established: 9 October 1966
- Cathedral: Cathedral Basilica of Saint-Denis
- Patron saint: Saint Denis of Paris
- Secular priests: 79 (Diocesan); 32 (Religious Orders); 23 (Permanent Deacons)

Current leadership
- Pope: Leo XIV
- Bishop: Étienne Guillet
- Metropolitan Archbishop: Laurent Ulrich

Map

Website
- saint-denis.catholique.fr

The Diocese of Saint-Denis in Île-de-France (Latin: Dioecesis Sancti Dionysii in Francia; French: Diocèse de Saint-Denis-en-France) is a Latin diocese of the Catholic Church in France.

Erected in 1966 by Pope Paul VI, the diocese was split off from the Archdiocese of Paris and the Diocese of Versailles. Its territory comprises the department of Seine-Saint-Denis. The diocese is a suffragan of the Archdiocese of Paris.

As of 2020, the Archdiocese was preparing to twin with the Archdiocese of Owando in the Republic of Congo. This came after a visit from Mgr Pascal Delannoy to the Archdiocese of Owando in July 2020.

== Ordinaries ==
- Jacques Le Cordier † (9 Oct 1966 Appointed – 1 Apr 1978 Retired)
- Guy Gérard Deroubaix † (1 Apr 1978 Succeeded – 8 Jan 1996 Died)
- Olivier Jean-Marie Michel de Berranger, Ist. del Prado † (6 Sep 1996 – 15 Jan 2009)
- Pascal Michel Ghislain Delannoy (11 March 2009 – 21 Apr 2024)
