= Pascal Delannoy =

Archbishop of Strasbourg, France

His Excellency Pascal Delannoy
- Archbishop of Strasbourg
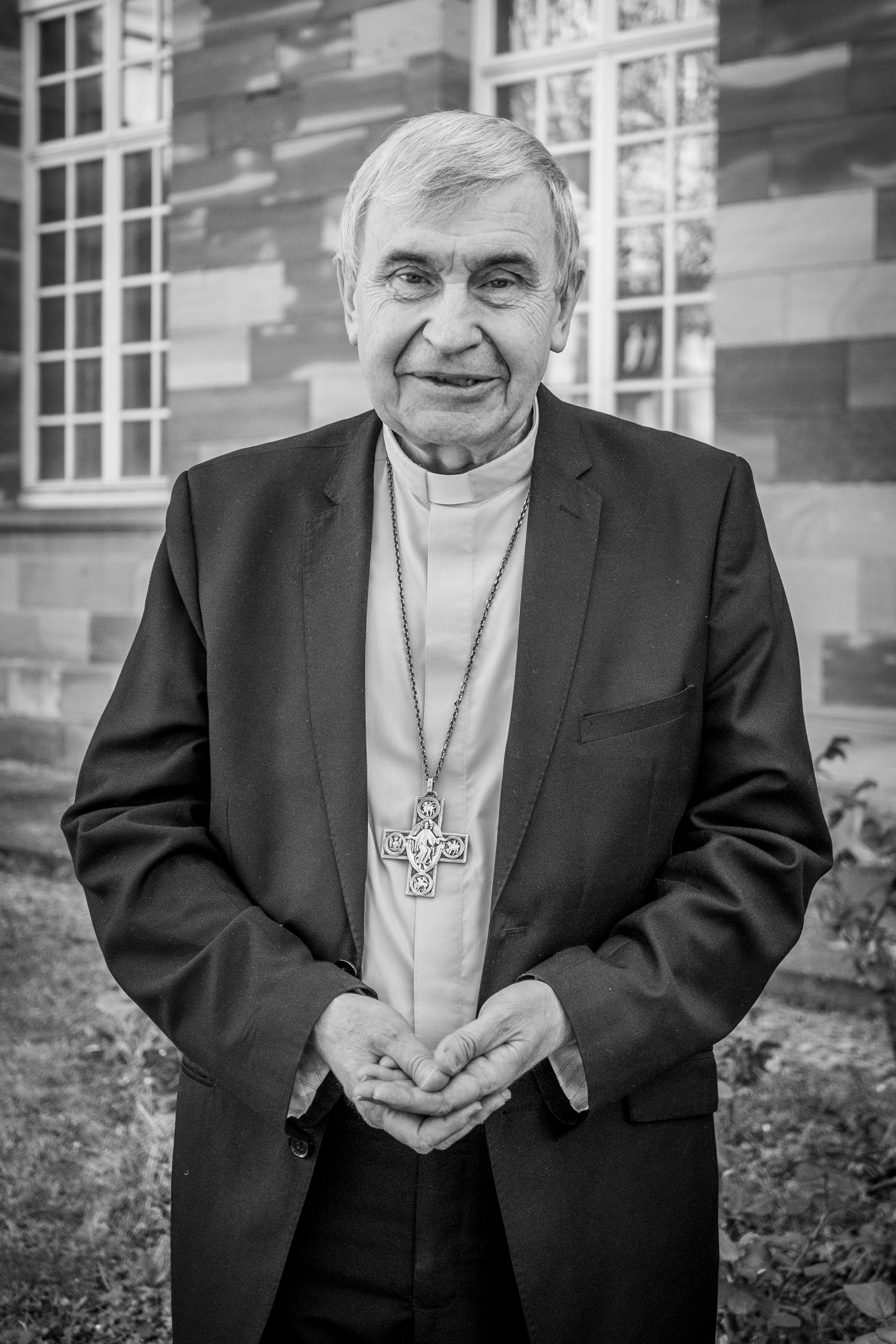
- Delannoy in 2024
- Archdiocese: Roman Catholic Archdiocese of Strasbourg
- Appointed: 28 February 2024
- Installed: 21 April 2024
- Predecessor: Luc Ravel
- Previous post: Bishop of Saint-Denis (2009-2024)

Orders
- Ordination: 4 June 1989 by Gérard Defois
- Consecration: 12 September 2004

Personal details
- Born: 2 April 1957 (age 69) Comines, Nord, Hauts-de-France
- Coat of arms

Styles of Pascal Delannoy
- Reference style: The Most Reverend
- Spoken style: Monsignor
- Religious style: Monsignor

Pascal Michel Ghislain Delannoy (born 2 April 1957) is a French prelate of the Catholic Church who is the archbishop of Strasbourg. He was bishop of Saint-Denis from 2009 to 2024. He served as an auxiliary bishop of Lille from 2004 to 2009.

== Biography ==
Delannoy was born on 2 April 1957 in Comines, in the Department of Nord, the son of Jacques Delannoy, the owner of a lumber yard, and Anne-Marie Carissimo. He attended the Institute Saint-Jude in Armentières and the Lycée Saint Paul. He earned a master's degree in economics at the Catholic University of Lille. He then worked as an accountant for four years. Delannoy then entered the Seminary of Lille to prepare for the priesthood. He was ordained a priest for the Diocese of Lille by Bishop Gérard Defois on 4 June 1989.

For twelve years Delannoy served in a parish in Roubaix, one of the poorest cities in France. Beginning in 1991 he took on other roles. He was responsible for diocesan activities in independent sites from 1991 to 1999. In 1997 was also named dean of the urban district of Roubaix and of Bailleul. In 1999 he was appointed episcopal vicar of French Flanders, and in 2003 was given additional responsibility as dean of Houtland.

Delannoy was appointed an auxiliary bishop of Lille and titular bishop of Usinaza by Pope John Paul II on 30 June 2004. He received his episcopal consecration on 12 September from Bishop Defois.

On 10 March 2009, Pope Benedict XVI appointed him Bishop of Saint Denis. He was installed there on 10 May.

On 28 February 2024, Pope Francis named him archbishop of Strasbourg, a year after Archbishop Luc Revel had been forced to submit his resignation after a Vatican investigation of his management of the Archdiocese. Delannoy was installed there on 21 April.

In the Bishops' Conference of France, Delannoy serves as president of the Episcopal Commissions on Finances and on Economic, Social and Legal Affairs. He was vice president of the CEF from 2013 to 2019.

== See also ==
- Catholic Church in France
- List of the Roman Catholic dioceses of France

Catholic Church titles
Preceded by Olivier de Berranger	Bishop of Saint-Denis; 2009–2024	Vacant
Preceded by Luc Ravel	Archbishop of Strasbourg; 2024–	Incumbent
