= Franz Zorn von Bulach =

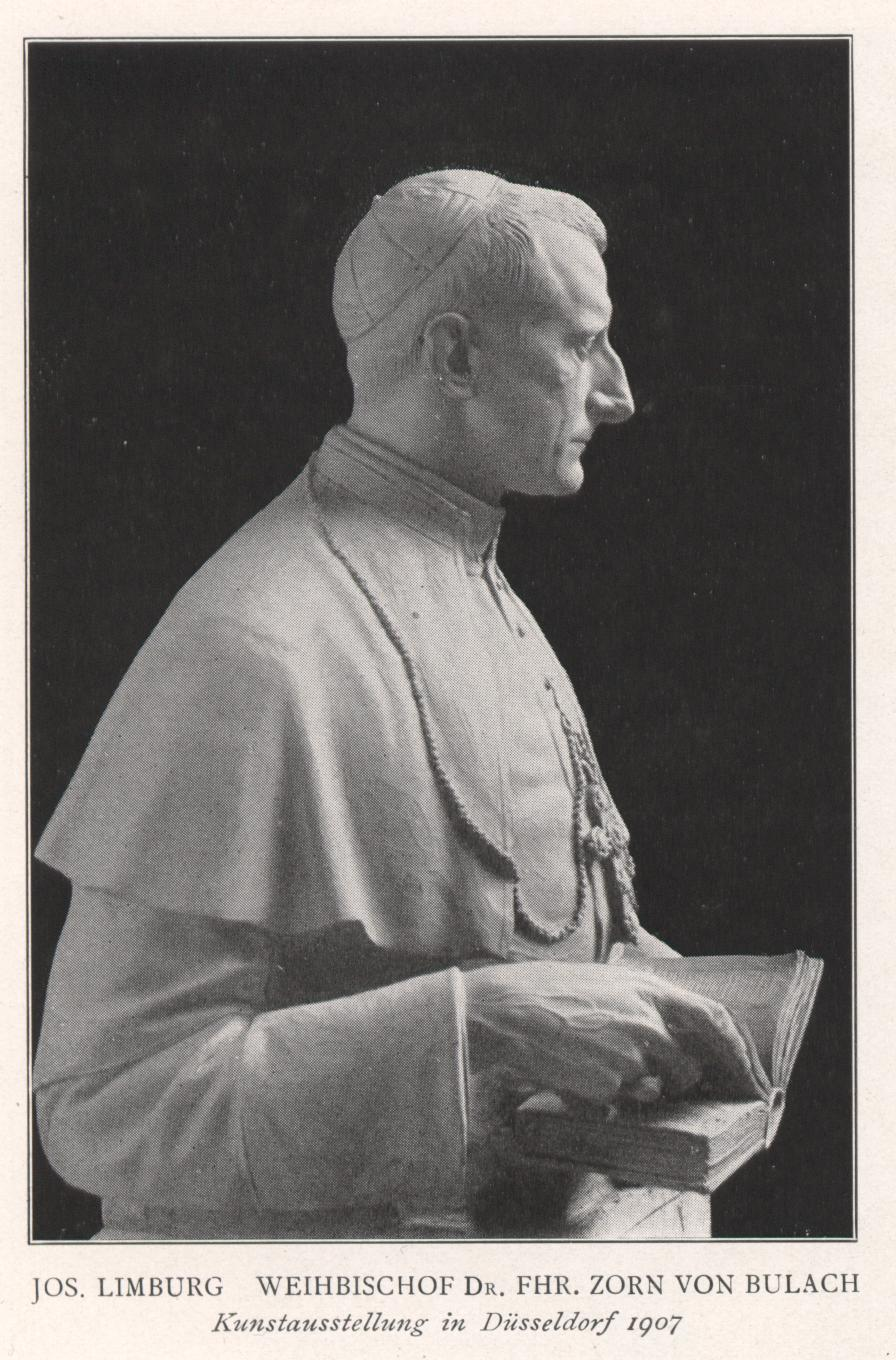

Franz Freiherr Zorn von Bulach (20 November 1858 – 13 January 1925) was a Catholic priest, a papal diplomat in Madrid, and auxiliary bishop in Strasbourg 1901–1919 and titular bishop of Erythrae.

Zorn von Bulach was born and died in Strasbourg. He came from an old Alsatian noble family, the Zorns. He was the son of François Zorn von Bulach (1828–1890), who was the chamberlain of Napoleon III and a deputy for Lower Alsace (Bas-Rhin), and his wife Antoinette née von Reinbach-Hirtzbach.

Franz Zorn von Bulach studied law, then worked in the German Foreign Office for a short while. On 10 August 1891 he was ordained a priest in Strasbourg, was appointed to the papal diplomatic service and worked secretary of the Apostolic Nunciature in Madrid.

In 1900, Franz Zorn von Bulach was the Alsatian preferred candidate for the vacant bishop's chair of Metz. The German Emperor Wilhelm II, however, brought about the appointment of his favourite, the German Benedictine and Prussian subject Willibrord Benzler.

Franz Zorn von Bulach was instead appointed on 24 October 1901 as auxiliary bishop of his home diocese of Strasbourg, and titular bishop of Erythrae. He was consecrated a bishop on 3 November 1901 in Rome, by Francesco Cardinal Satolli, as well as curia archbishop Edmund Stonor and Rafael Cardinal Merry del Val y Zulueta (later the state secretary of Pius X). He exercised the office of auxiliary bishop of Strasbourg from 1901 to 1919, and from 1903 he was also the vicar general of the diocese; this included the difficult time of the First World War, when the diocese was part of the battle area and numerous foreign soldiers were present. After France took over Alsace in 1919, the bishops appointed under the German government had to resign. This applied also to Franz Zorn von Bulach, who died in 1925 as a bishop emeritus.

His brother Hugo Zorn von Bulach was a politician and representative at the German Reichstag.
