= Rozelieures =

- Commune
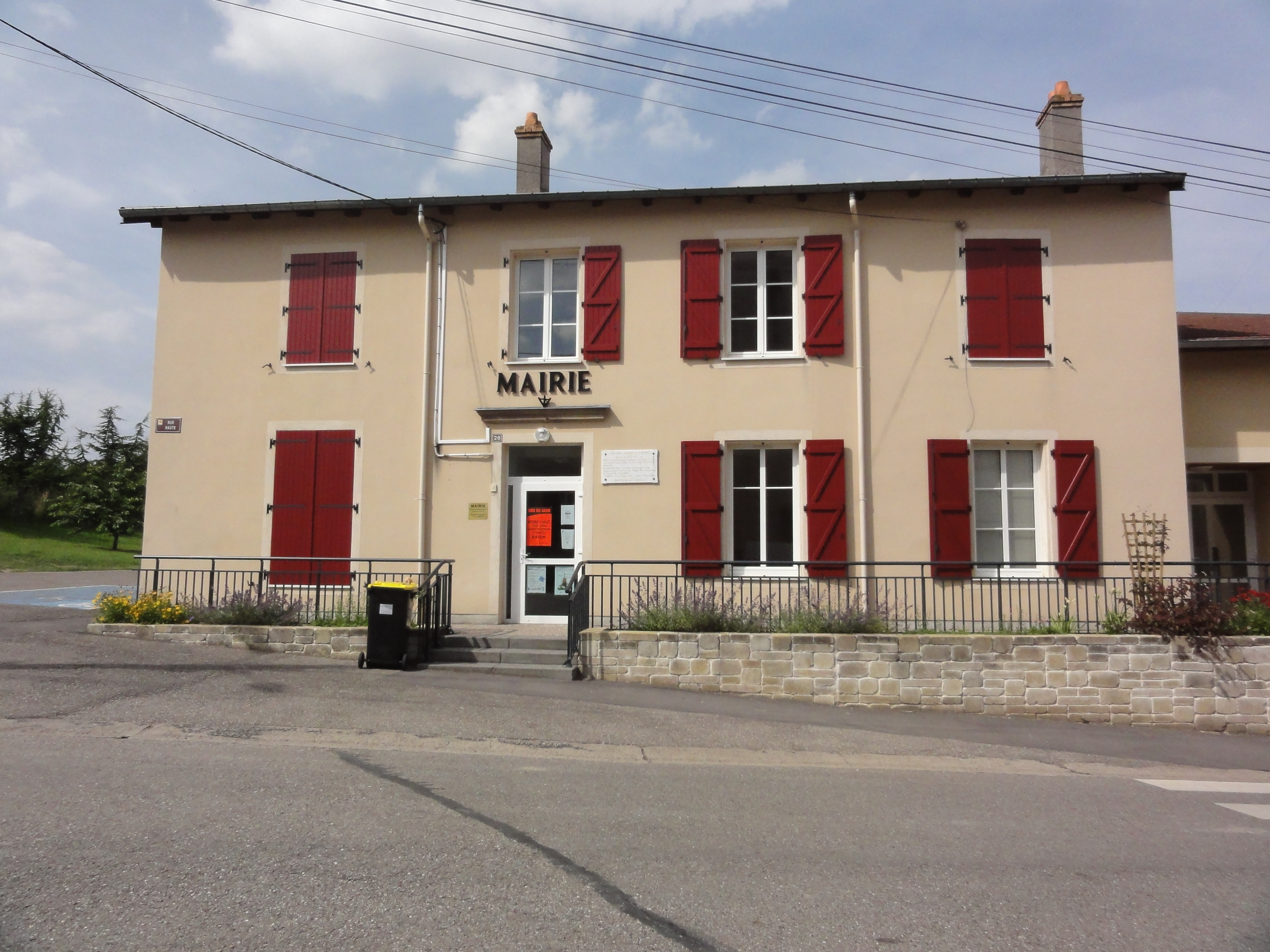
- The town hall in Rozelieures

- Coat of arms
- Location of Rozelieures
- Location within France Location within Grand Est
- Coordinates: 48°27′04″N 6°26′07″E
- Country: France
- Region: Grand Est
- Department: Meurthe-et-Moselle
- Arrondissement: Lunéville
- Canton: Lunéville-2
- Intercommunality: CC Meurthe, Mortagne, Moselle

Government
  - Mayor (2020–2026): Jean-Pierre Jaquat
- Area^{1}: 9.38 km^{2} (3.62 sq mi)
- Elevation: 301 m (988 ft)
- Highest elevation: 363 m (1,191 ft)
- Lowest elevation: 263 m (863 ft)
- Population (2023): 185
  - Density: 19.7/km^{2} (51.1/sq mi)
- Time zone: UTC+01:00 (CET)
  - Summer (DST): UTC+02:00 (CEST)
- INSEE/Postal code: 54467 /54290
- ^{1} French Land Register data, which excludes lakes, ponds, glaciers > 1 km^{2} (0.386 sq mi or 247 acres) and river estuaries.

Rozelieures (French pronunciation: [ʁoz(ə)ljœʁ]) is a commune in the Meurthe-et-Moselle department in north-eastern France. It is known as the namesake of Rozelieures whisky.

== See also ==
- Communes of the Meurthe-et-Moselle department
