= Luc Ravel =

Roman Catholic archbishop (born 1957)

His Excellency The Most Reverend Luc Ravel
- Archbishop Emeritus of Strasbourg
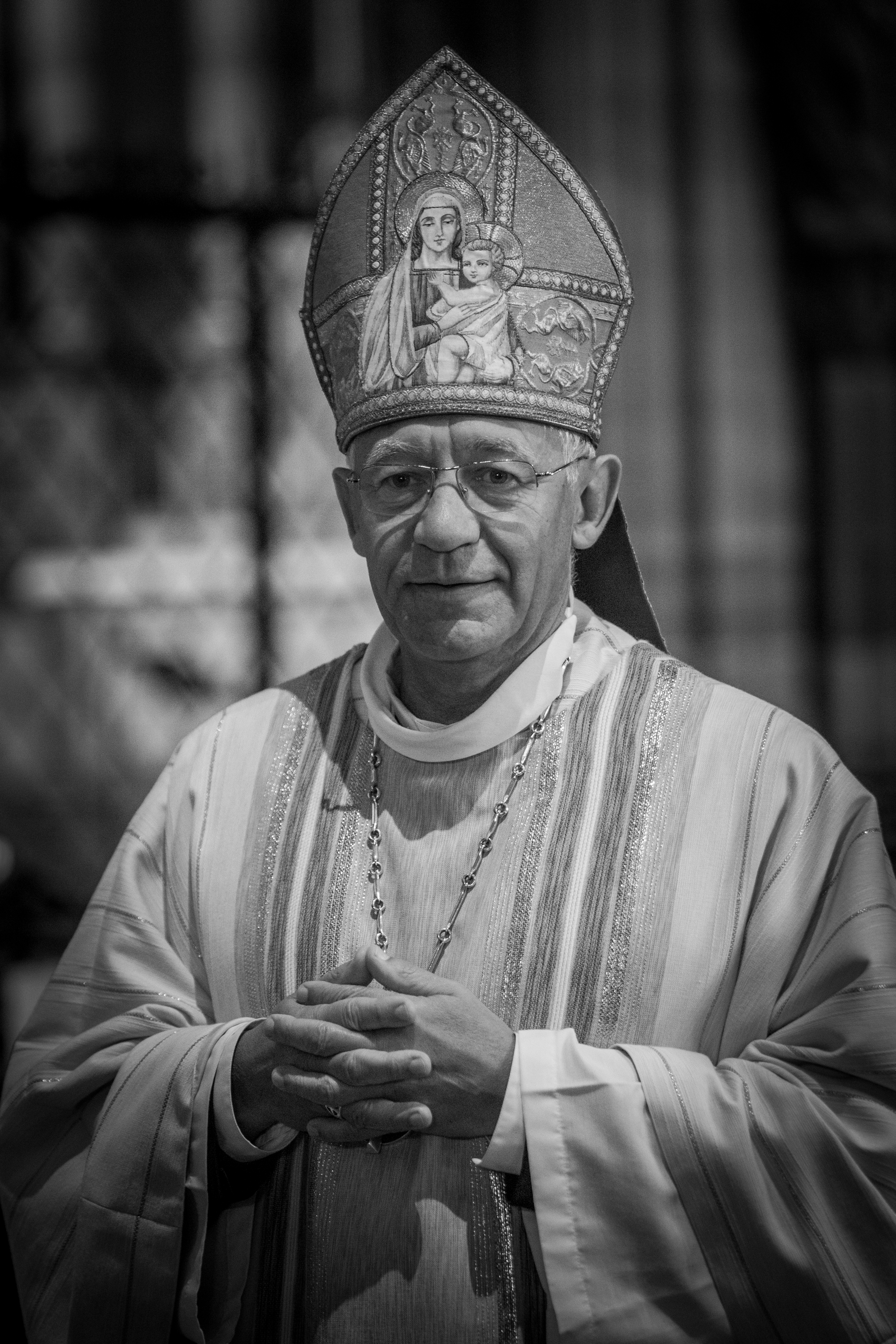
- Installed: 2 April 2017
- Term ended: 27 May 2023
- Predecessor: Jean-Pierre Grallet
- Successor: Pascal Delannoy
- Previous posts: Archbishop of Strasbourg (2017-2023); Bishop of the French Armed Forces (2009-2017)

Orders
- Ordination: 25 June 1988
- Consecration: 29 November 2009 by André Vingt-Trois

Personal details
- Born: Luc Marie Daniel Ravel; May 21, 1957 (age 69) Paris, France
- Education: École Polytechnique University of Poitiers
- Motto: Est, est (Literally: "It is, it is") (Poetically: "That your yes be yes") Matthew 5:37

Styles of Luc Ravel
- Reference style: The Most Reverend
- Spoken style: Your Excellency
- Religious style: Monsignor

Luc Marie Daniel Ravel, C.R.S.V. (born 21 May 1957) is a French prelate of the Catholic Church, who was the Archbishop of Strasbourg from 2017 to 2023, when he resigned at the age of 66. He was bishop of the Diocese of the French Armed Forces from 2009 to 2017.

== Early life ==
Ravel was born in Paris on 21 May 1957 to a family with origins in Martinique and Réunion on his father's side, and in the Var department of France on his mother's side. He was born the fourth child in a family of three girls and four boys. He graduated from the École Polytechnique and studied to become an engineer at the IFP School. He studied philosophy and theology at the Abbey Saint-Pierre in the commune of Champagne, in the Ardèche department in southern France, and at the University of Poitiers.

== Career ==
He made his solemn profession as a Canon Regular of St. Victor (Note: The Canons Regular of St. Victor, suppressed in 1790, was revived in 1968. In 1993 it became the Congregation of St. Victor attached to the Canons Regular of St. Augustine.) on 7 December 1985 and was ordained a priest on 25 June 1988.

He was then prior at the Church of Saint-Charles at Porrentruy, in Jura, Switzerland, at Montbron, and at the Tardoire and Bandiat deanery in Charente. He returned to the Abbey of Saint-Pierre where he was master of novices from 1996 to 2007 and subprior from 2003 to 2009. He founded Notre-Dame de l'Écoute, a movement for single and celibate people.

He was appointed bishop of the Diocese of the French Armed Forces by Pope Benedict XVI on 7 October 2009.

He received his episcopal consecration in Notre Dame Cathedral on 29 November 2009 from Cardinal André Vingt-Trois. He was elected a member of the Doctrinal Commission of the Bishops' Conference of France in 2011.

Writing in the monthly magazine of his chaplaincy in February 2015, Ravel called abortion a "weapon of mass destruction" and called for the return of the abortion debate in French society. In response, the French Defence Minister asked the Diocese's magazine to stop displaying the Army's logo on the cover so as to distance the Army from its content.

Ravel was appointed Archbishop of Strasbourg on 18 February 2017.

His tenure in Strasbourg proved turbulent, as he was criticized for an authoritarian management style and neglect of his duties. He was the only French bishop to support French President Emmanuel Macron in the 2022 election and skipped the annual chrism Mass to attend a Macron rally. He supported the work of the Missionaries of Divine Mercy to evangelize Muslims, a controversial approach in contrast to interfaith dialog. His dismissal of several senior diocesan officials provoked concern, as did his removal of women and laymen from archdiocesan councils. In response to complaints the Vatican conducted an apostolic visitation of the Strasbourg archdiocese in the summer of 2022. (Note: The investigation was conducted by Stanislas Lalanne, bishop of Pontoise, assisted by Archbishop Joël Mercier, former secretary of the Dicastery for the Clergy.) Ravel then resisted when his resignation was demanded. In late March 2023, he removed his vicar general, who was thought a likely candidate to manage the archdiocese if Ravel resigned. (Note: Ravel removed his auxiliary Christian Kratz as vicar general citing the mishandling of the case of a priest convicted of sexual abuse, though he did not explain what Kratz's responsibility was.) Ravel submitted his resignation on 20 April 2023.

Pope Francis accepted his resignation on 27 May 2023 and named Archbishop-Bishop Philippe Ballot of Metz to administer the archdiocese. Macron's consent, given on 24 May, was published the same day. Because the appointment of Strasbourg's archbishop is governed by the Concordat of 1801, Ravel's removal required the assent of the French president, which Ravel had hoped would not be forthcoming.

== Notes ==
Catholic Church titles
Preceded by Jean-Pierre Grallet	Archbishop of Strasbourg; 2017–2023	Succeeded by Pascal Delannoy
