= Church of Sainte‑Libaire =

Church in La Broque, France

Sainte-Libaire Church, La Broque
- Église Sainte-Libaire de La Broque
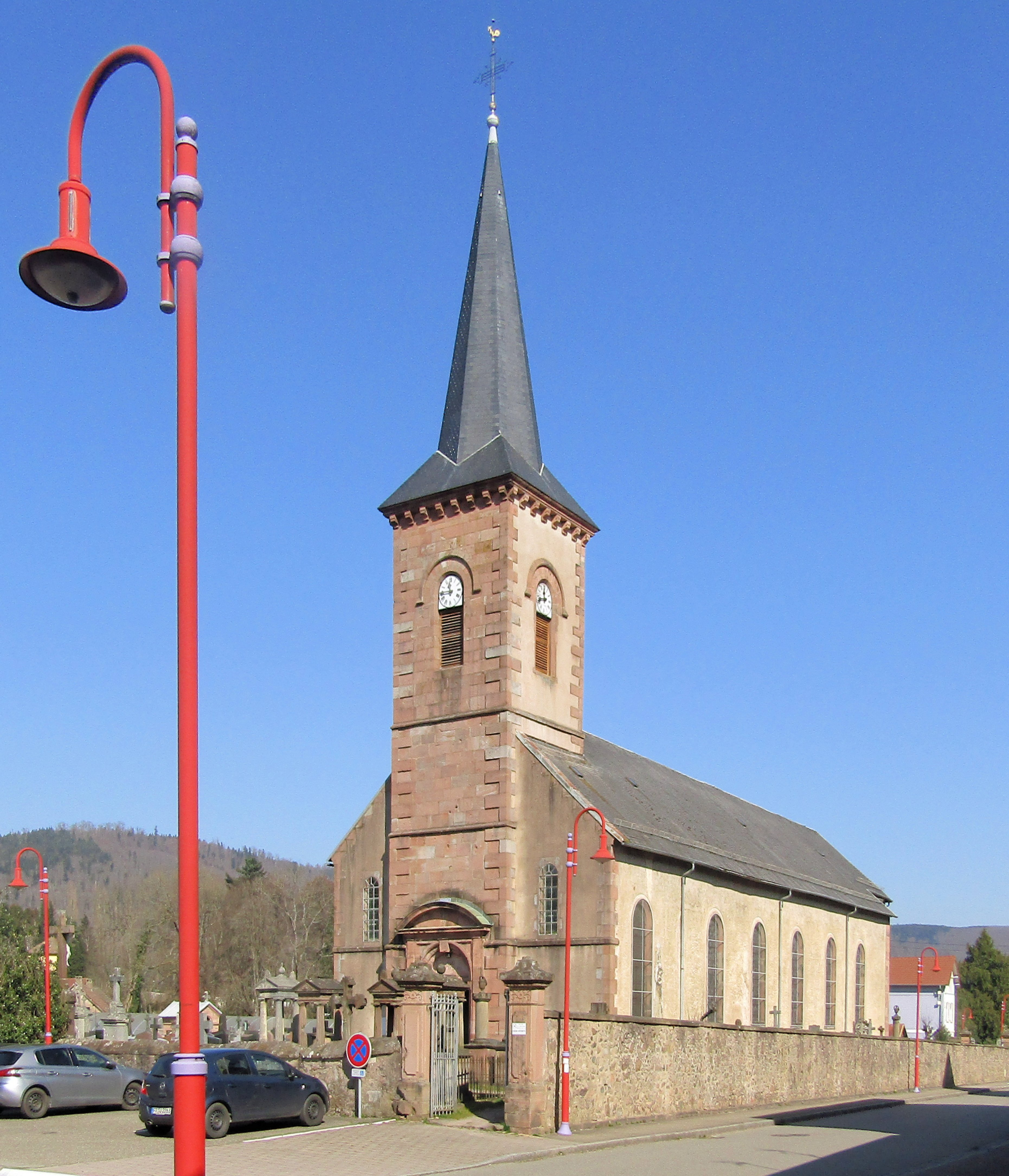
- Oblique view of the Catholic parish church Sainte-Libaire in La Broque
- Sainte-Libaire Church, La Broque
- Location: Rue du Général de Gaulle, La Broque, Bas-Rhin, Grand Est, France
- Country: France
- Denomination: Roman Catholic
- Website: Parish website

History
- Status: Parish church
- Founded: 1736
- Dedication: Saint Libaire

Architecture
- Functional status: Active
- Architect(s): François‑Eugène Grijolot (nave, 1869, neoclassical); Adeline Hébert‑Stevens (stained glass and ceramic Christ the King, 1961); Daniel Zinglé (tower restoration, 1984)
- Style: Baroque, Neoclassical
- Completed: 1869

Administration
- Archdiocese: Archdiocese of Strasbourg
- Deanery: Pays du Donon
- Parish: Sainte-Libaire de La Broque

The Church of Sainte‑Libaire (French: Église Sainte‑Libaire) is the Roman Catholic parish church of La Broque, in the Bas-Rhin department of the Grand Est region, France. Dedicated to Saint Libaire, a Lorraine martyr of the 4th century, it is one of the main religious buildings of the Bruche Valley. Its slender bell tower, visible from afar, rises as a landmark in the heart of the village.

== Location ==
The church stands in the centre of La Broque, on Rue du Général‑de‑Gaulle, on a plot enclosed by a sandstone wall. It is near Place Sainte‑Libaire and adjoins the communal cemetery, landscaped and dotted with old funerary monuments.

== History ==
=== 9th century ===
A Benedictine priory, called Vicpodi cella and founded by Abbot Vicpode of Senones, is attested around the year 800 at Vipucelle. · This priory, now disappeared, was not located on the site of the present church, but constitutes the first known religious foundation in La Broque.

=== 18th century ===
- 1736–1737: rebuilding of the porch‑tower, mentioned by Dom Calmet.

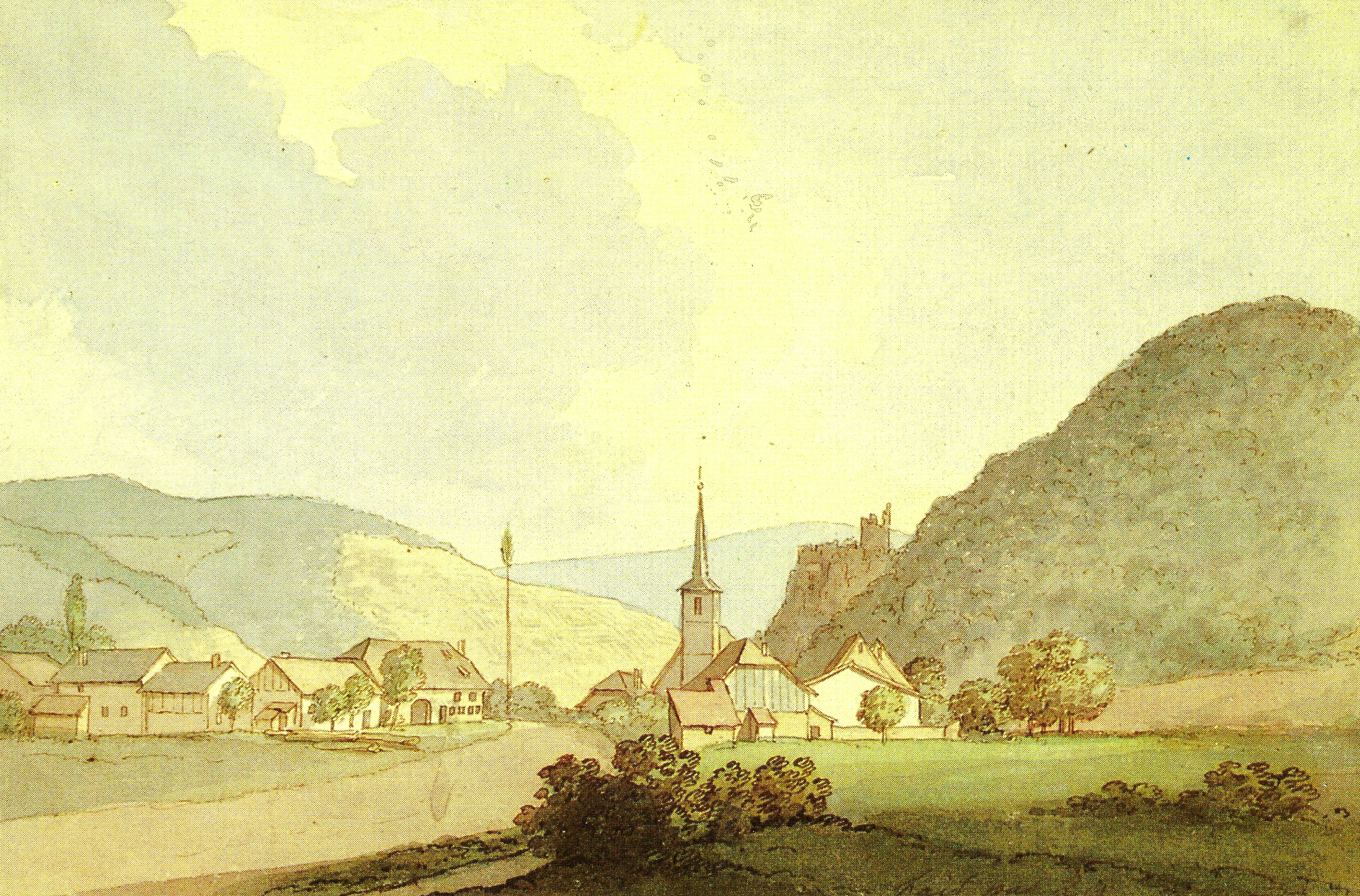
Engraving by Benjamin Zix (1795), showing the village and the church

=== 19th century ===
- 1827: rebuilding of the choir.
- 1869: complete reconstruction of the nave, probably to the plans of François‑Eugène Grijolot.

=== 20th century ===
- 1917: requisition of the bells by the German authorities, in the presence of parish priest Antoine Rapp.
- 1922–1923: casting and blessing of two new bells, Sainte Libaire and Marie‑France.
- 1929–1930: restoration and enlargement of the organ by Joseph Rinckenbach.
- 1953: electrification of the bells and overhaul of the organ by Alfred Kern.
- 1960–1961: general restoration under parish priest Lucien Friederich; solemn consecration on 29 October 1961 by Bishop Jean-Julien Weber.
- 1984: restoration of the tower by Daniel Zinglé, installation of a new gilded cockerel and cross.
- 1994: complete interior restoration.

== Architecture ==
=== General layout ===
- Porch‑tower in dressed sandstone, topped by a slate spire.
- Single‑aisle nave with six bays (1869).
- Choir with cut sides (1827).
- Sacristy adjoining the choir.
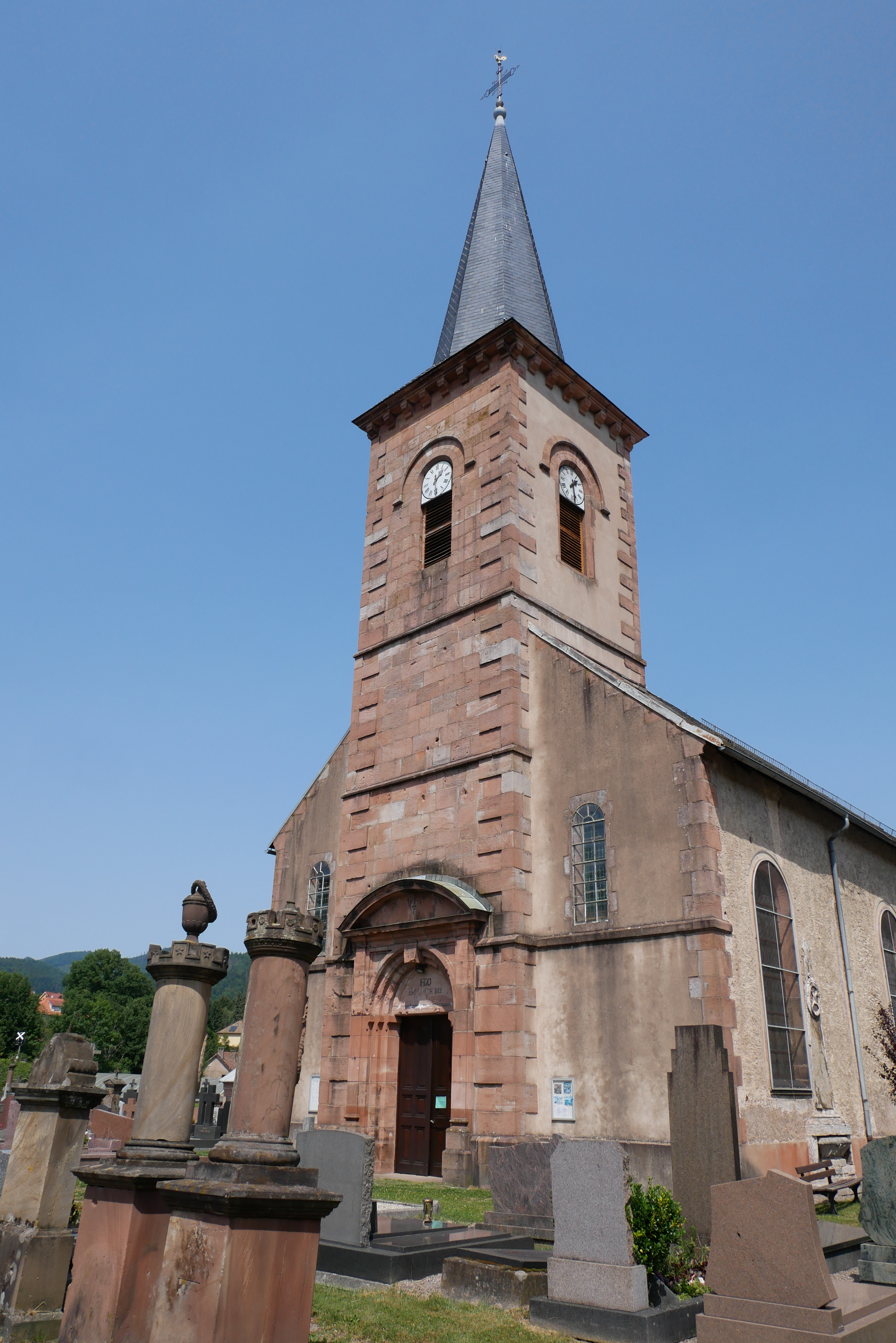
Exterior view

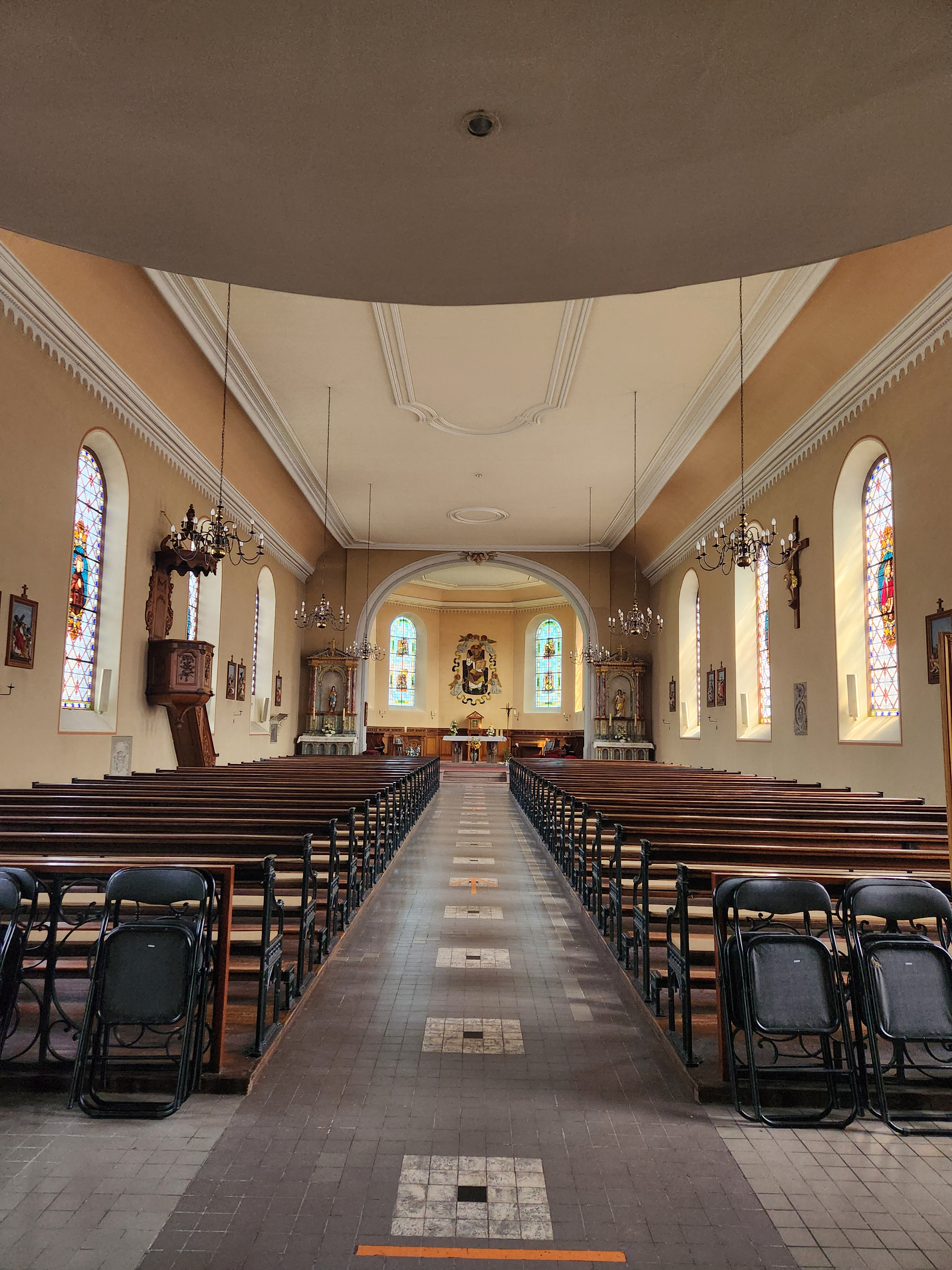
Interior, view from the entrance

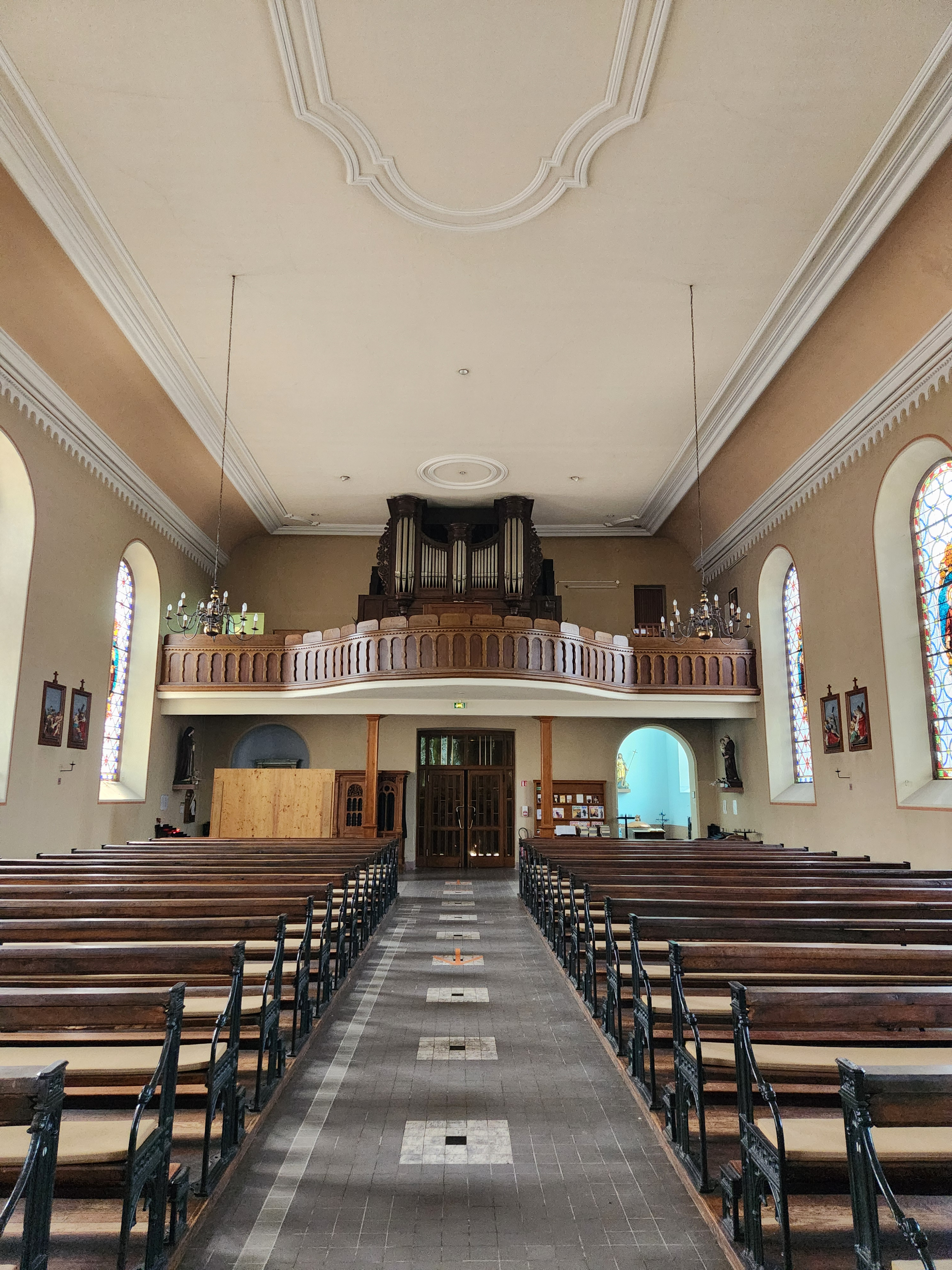
Interior, view from the altar

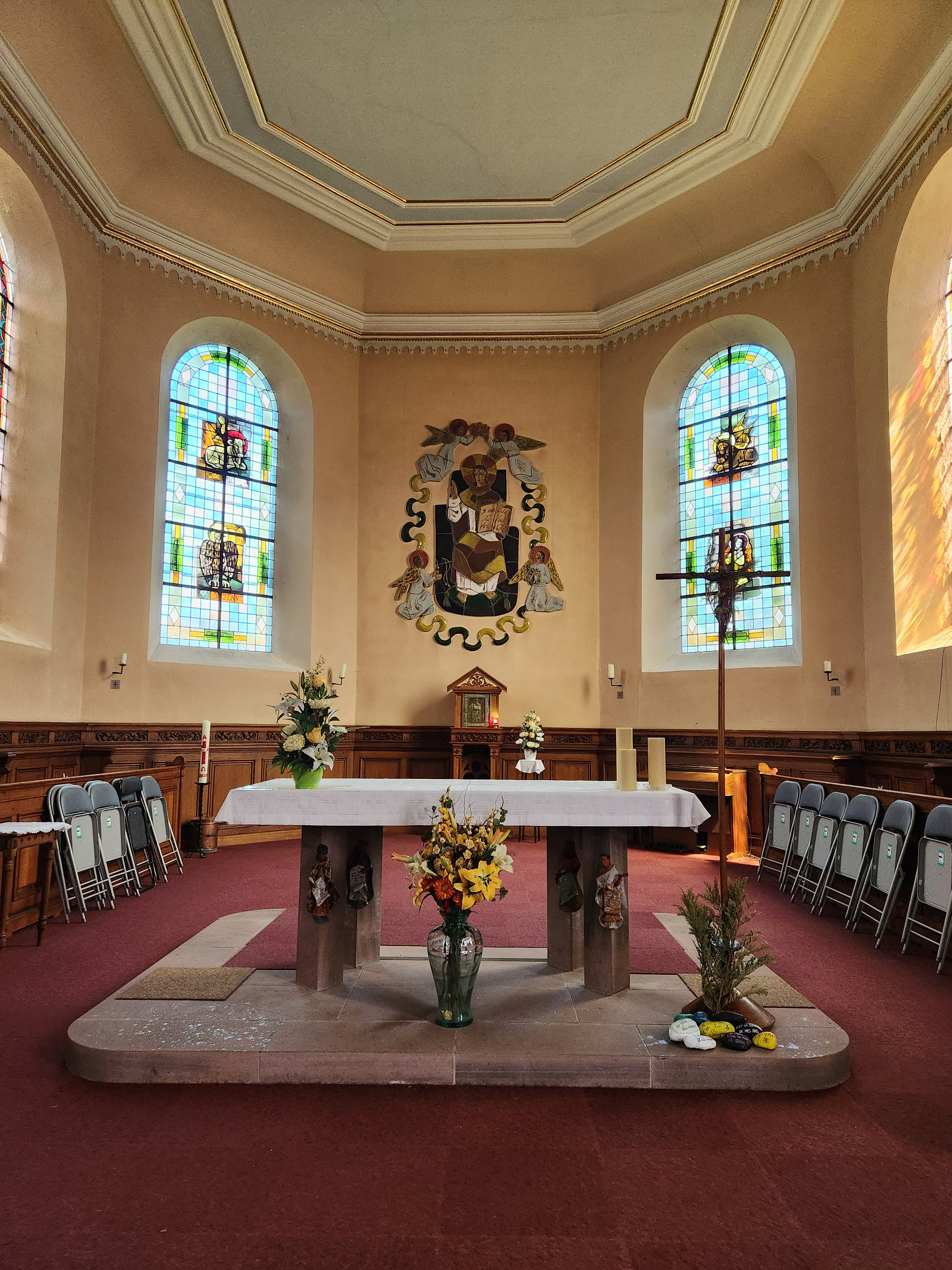
Choir in 2025

=== Stained glass ===
- 1869: ten grisaille windows with medallions of saints, workshops Maréchal and Champigneulle (Metz).
- 1961: replacement of the choir windows by the symbols of the four evangelists, work of Adeline Hébert‑Stevens.
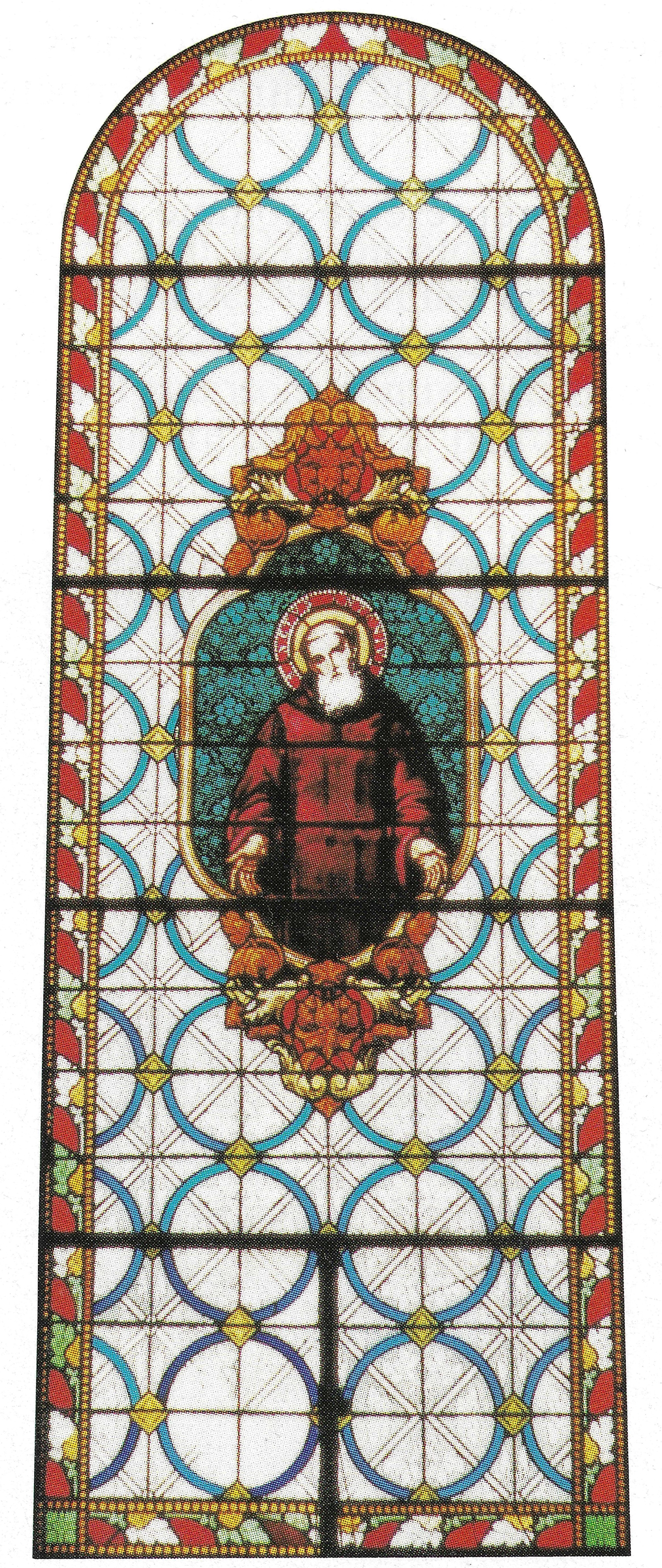
Window of Saint Anthony

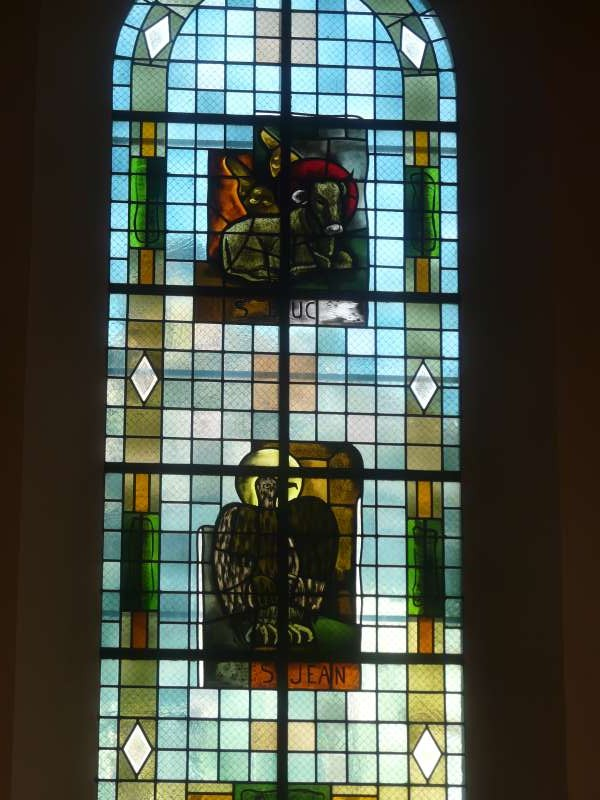
Window of the bull (Saint Luke) and the eagle (Saint John)

== Interior ==
=== Protected furnishings ===
Several items are listed in the Palissy inventory:

- Pulpit
- Organ by Rinckenbach and Wetzel
- Statue of Saint Libaire
- Bell by Fourno
- Two side altars
- 10 stained glass windows
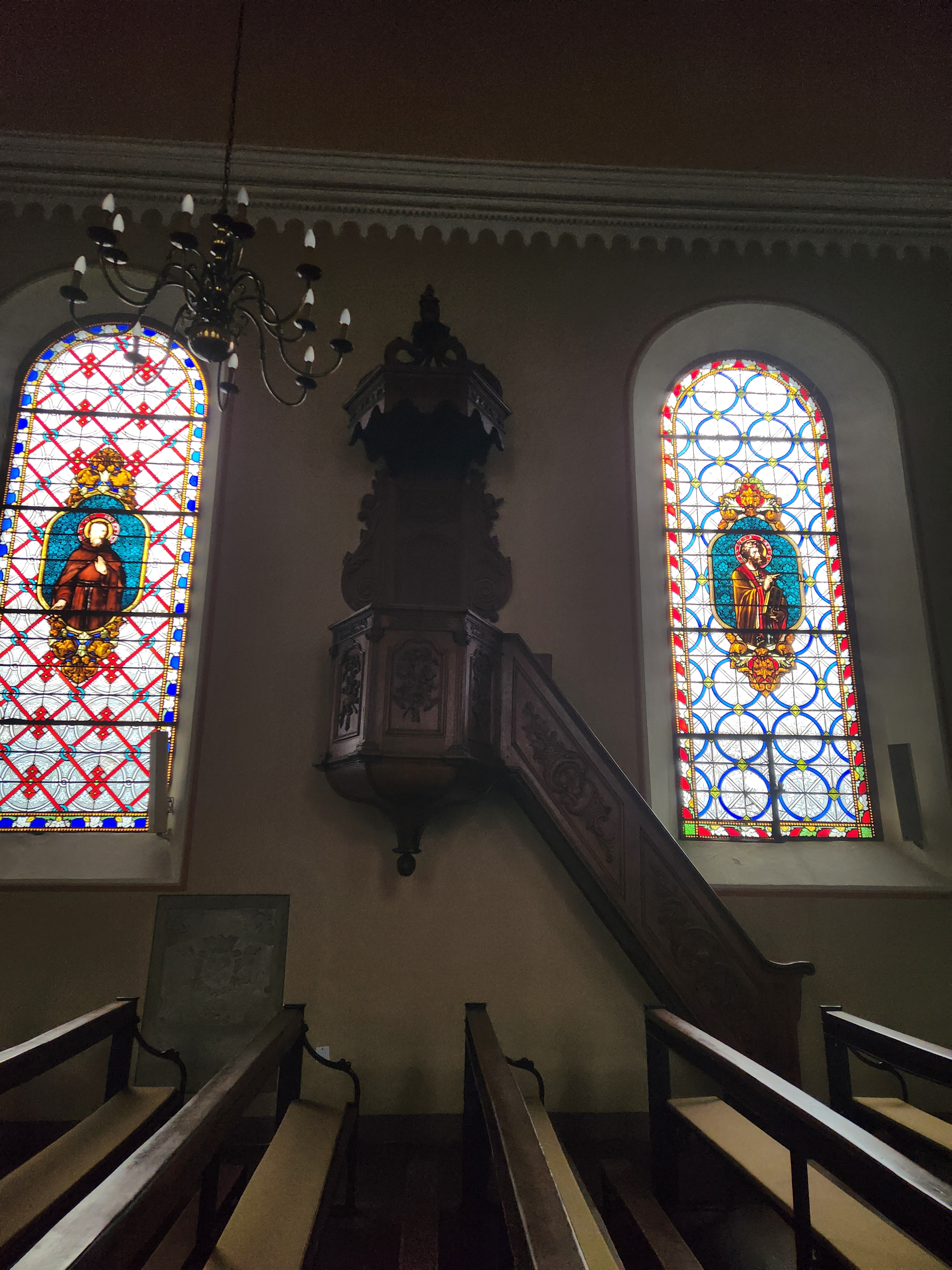
Pulpit

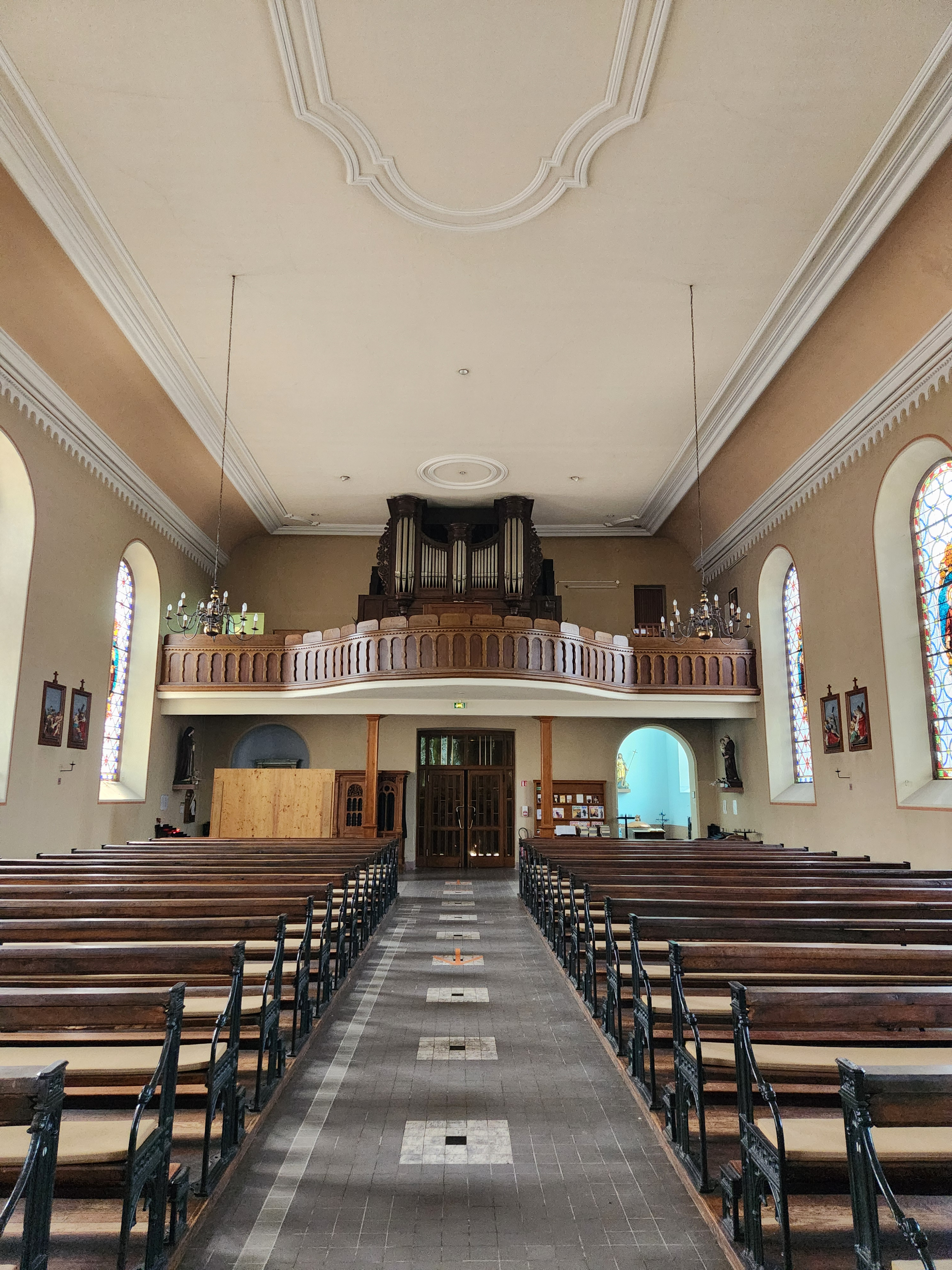
View of the organ

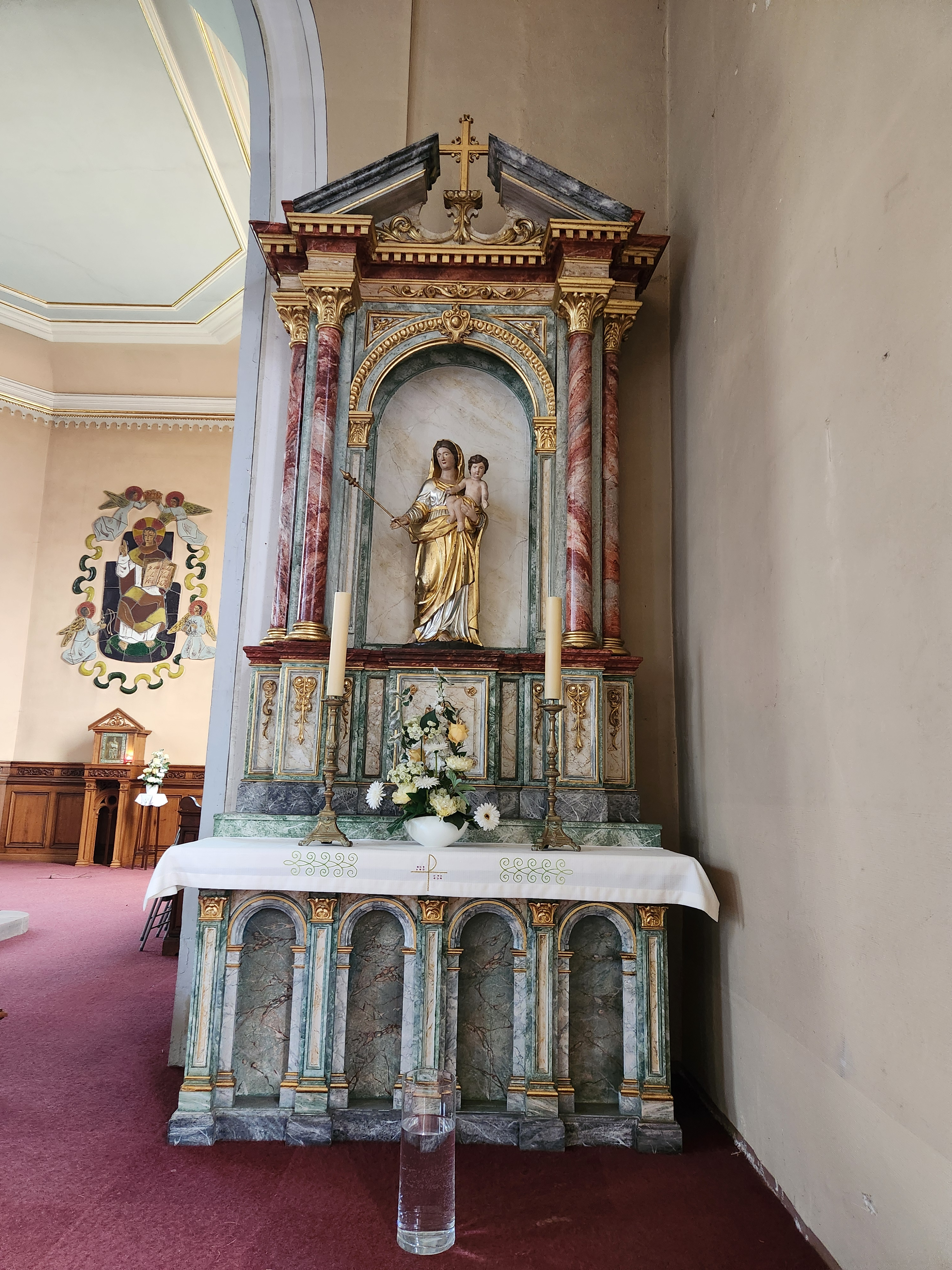
Right side altar dedicated to the Virgin and Child

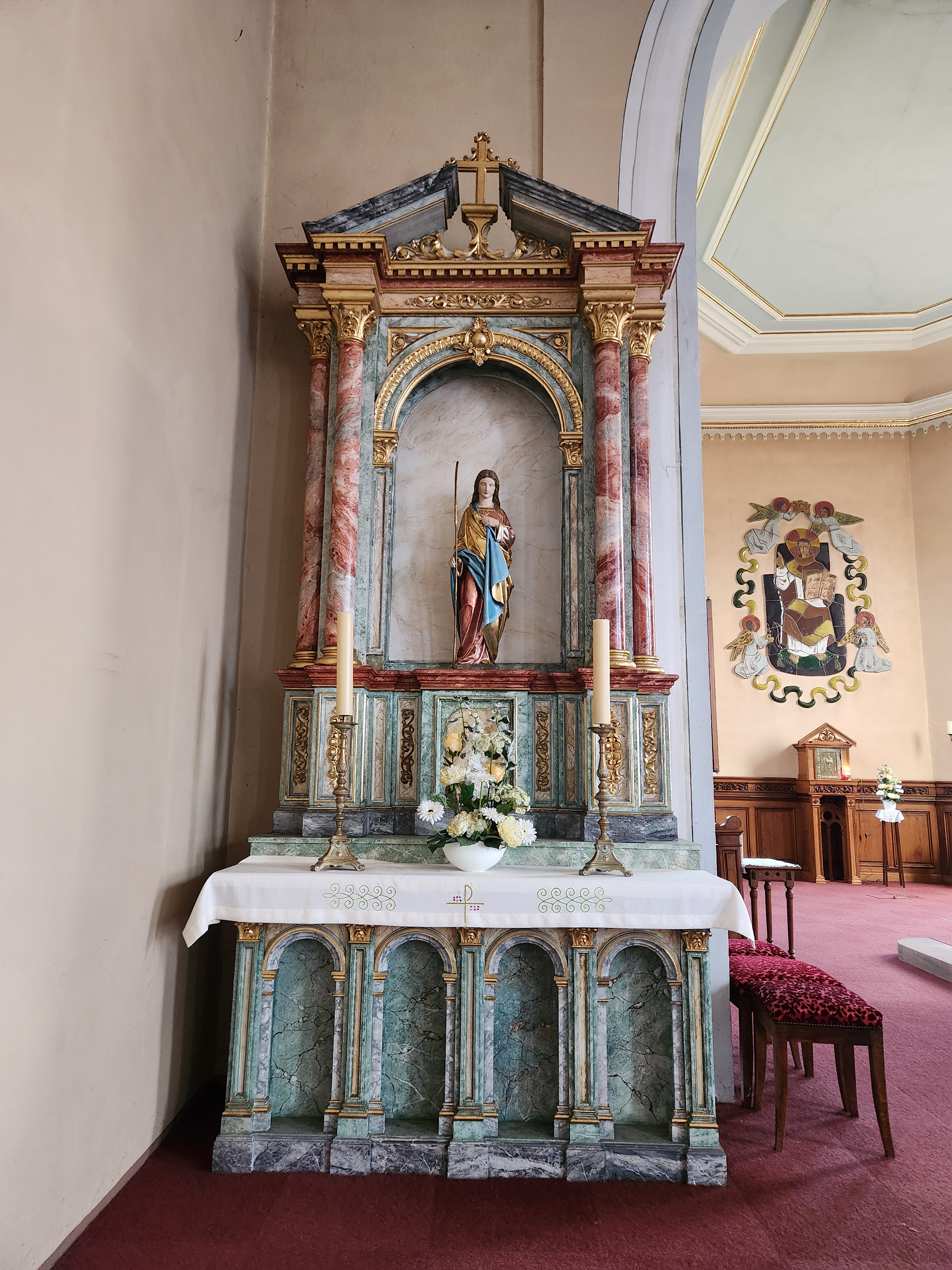
Left side altar dedicated to Saint Libaire

=== Other furnishings ===
In addition to the protected objects, the church preserves a rich collection of furniture:

- Statue of John the Baptist
- Wooden confessional
- Baptismal font
- Stone Christ affixed to the exterior wall
- Old tombstones and funerary plaques
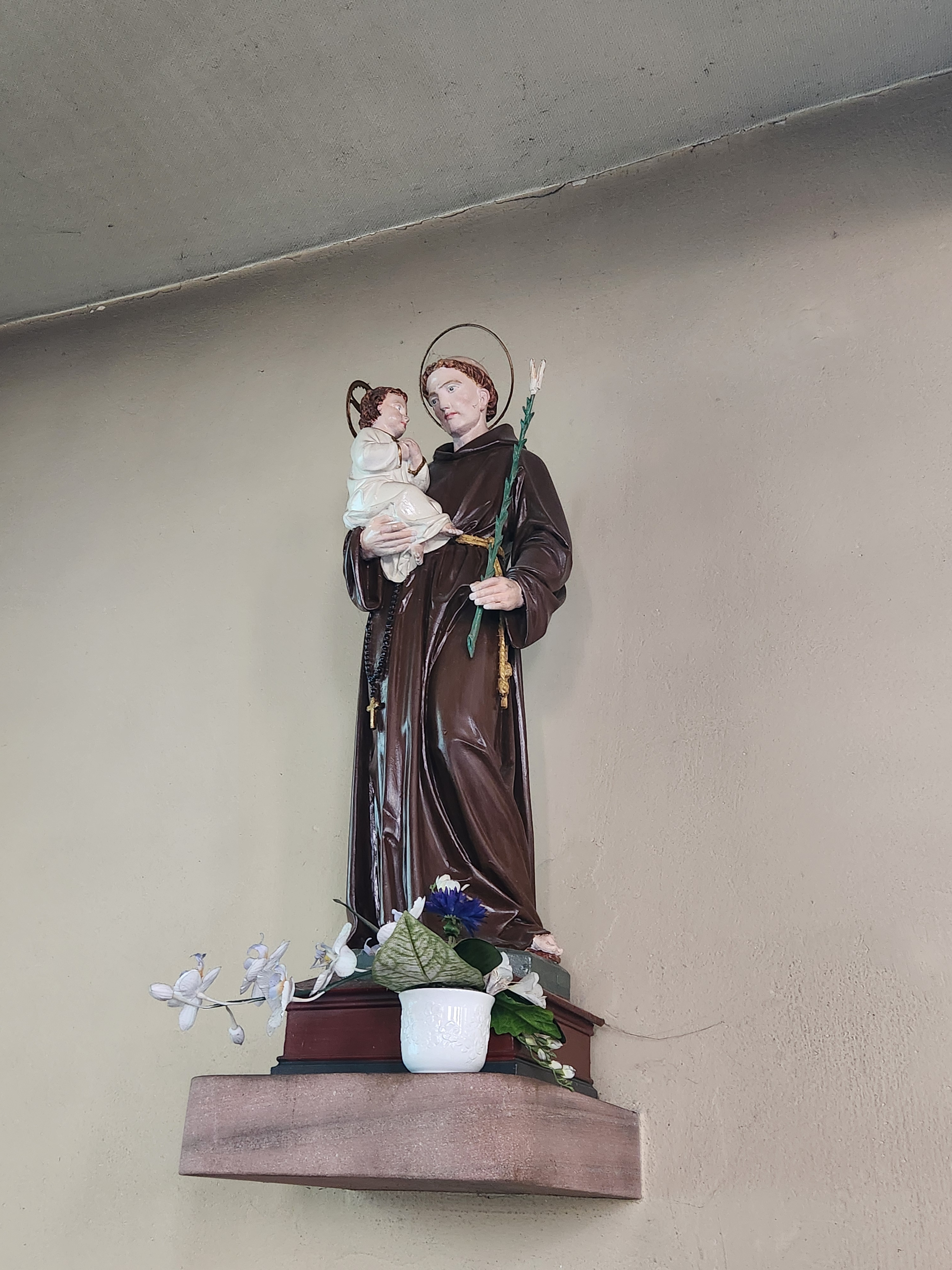
Statue of Saint John the Baptist

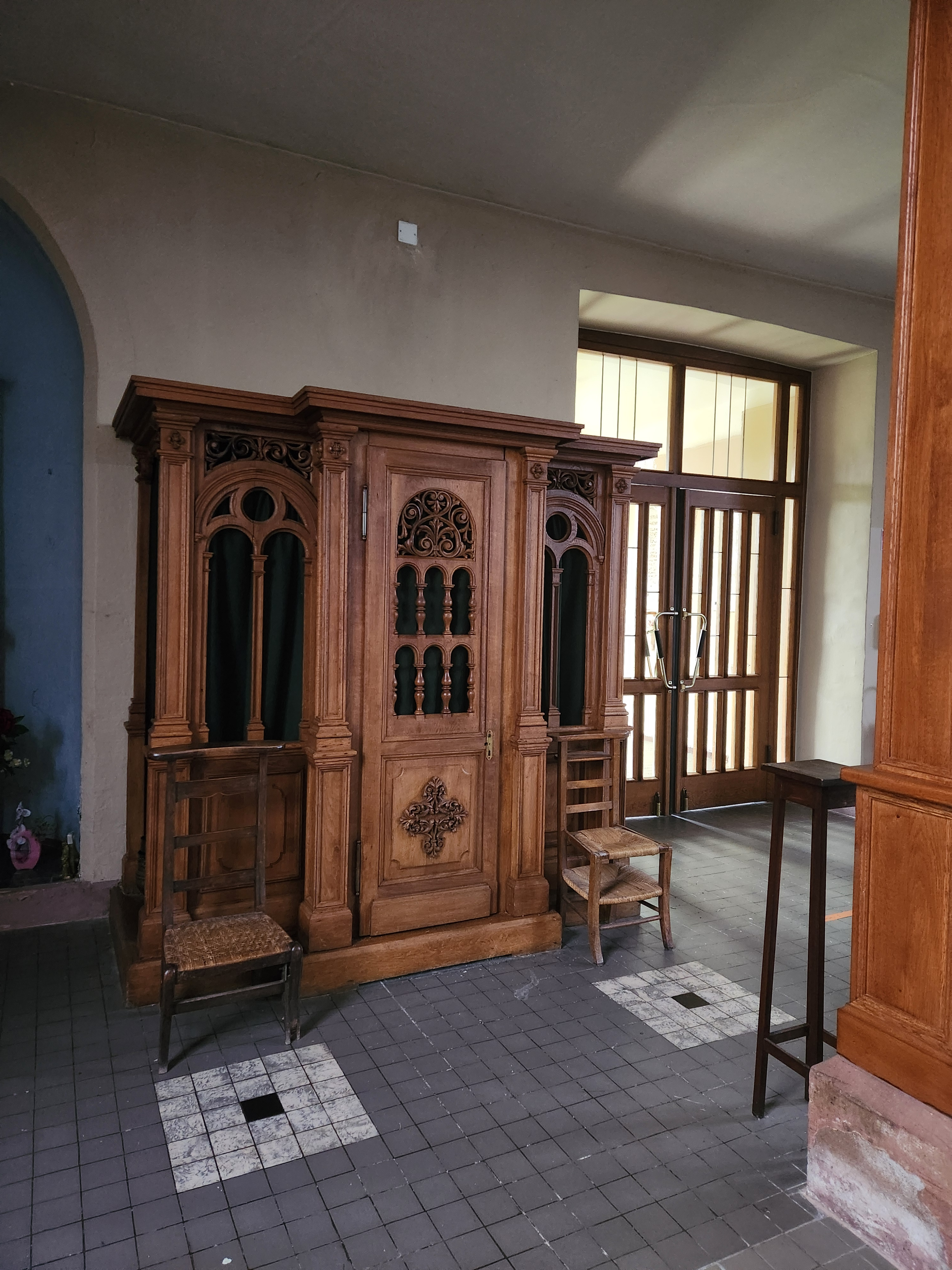
Confessional in carved wood

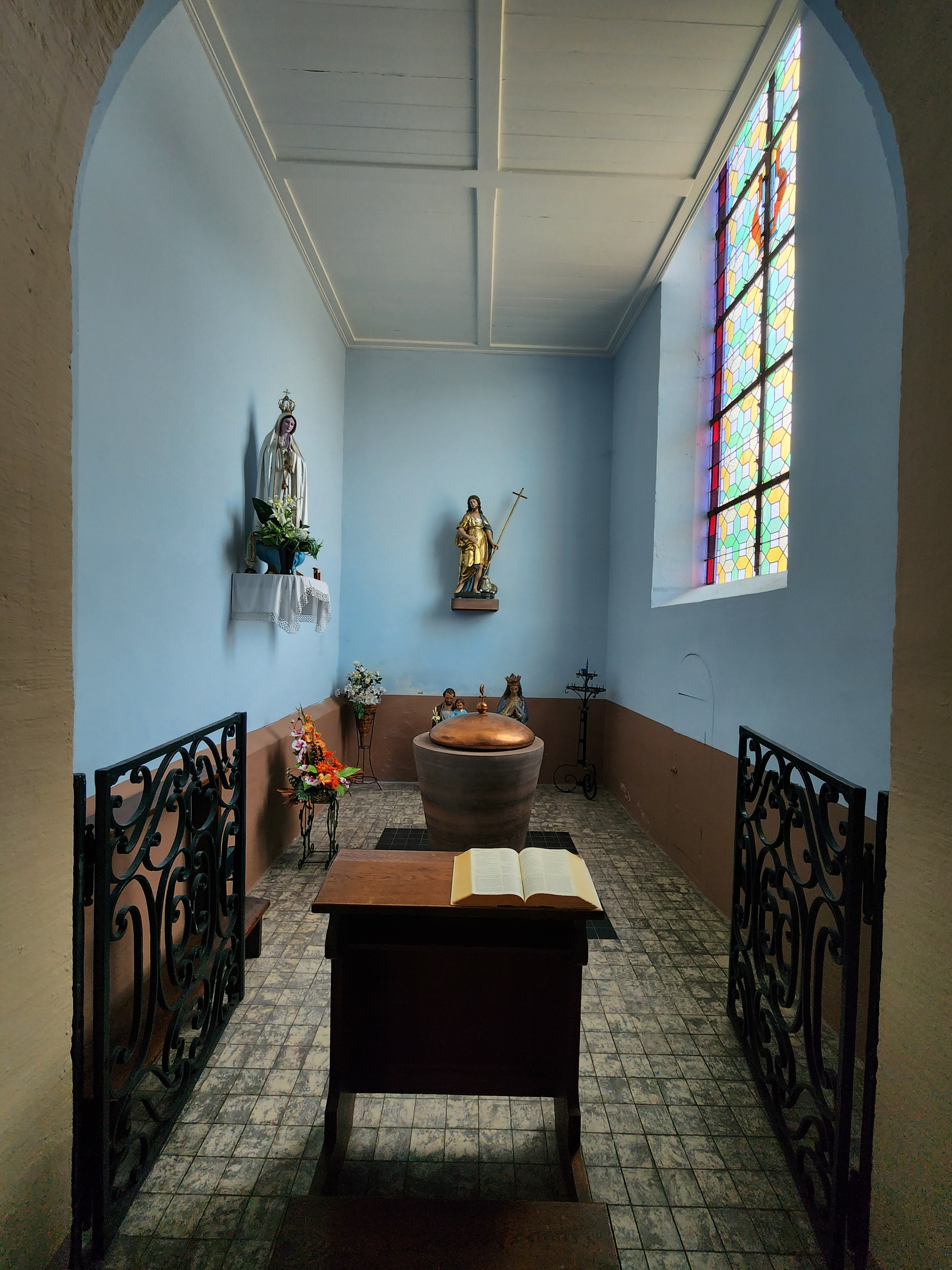
Baptismal font

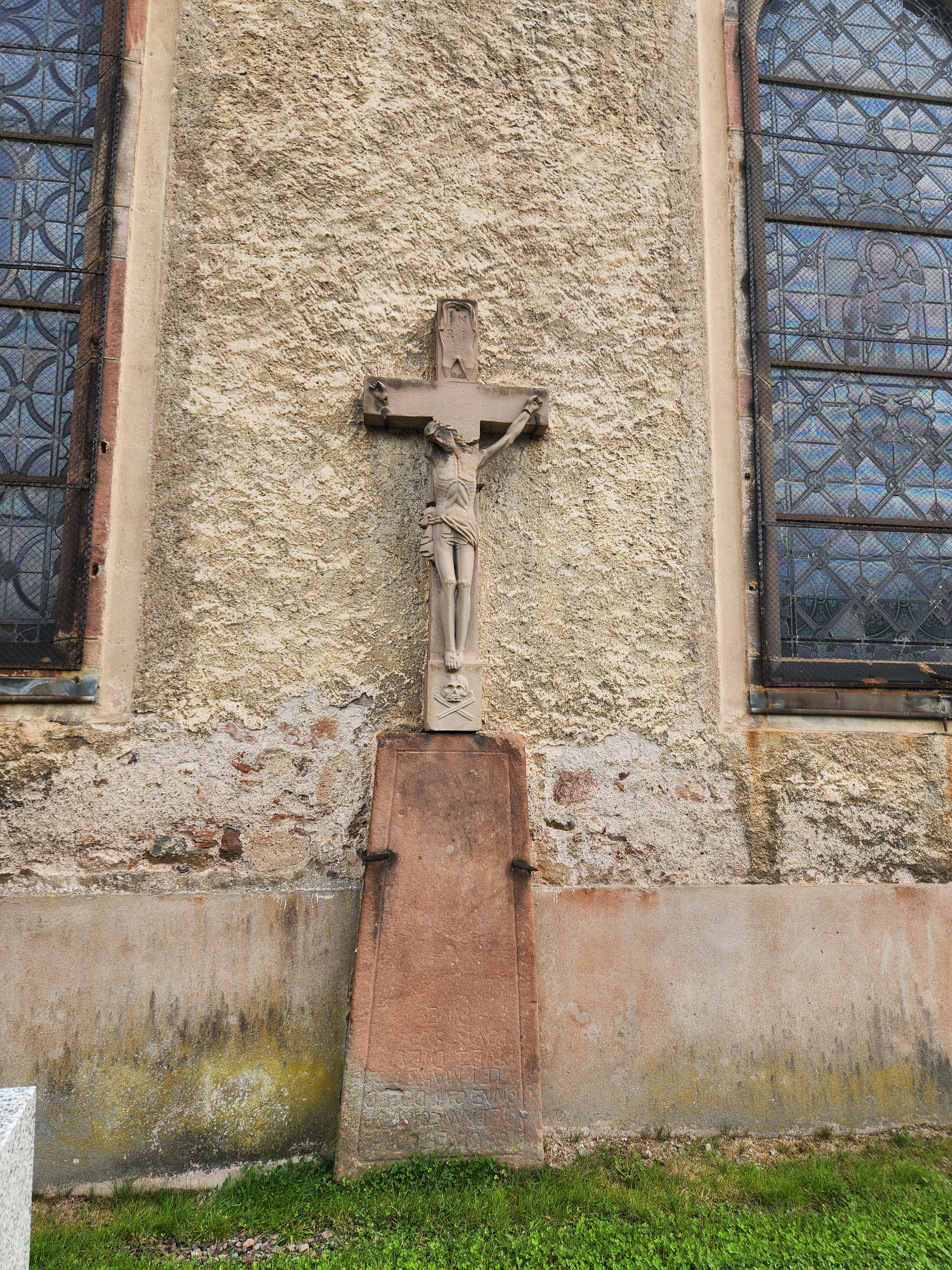
Stone Christ affixed to the exterior wall

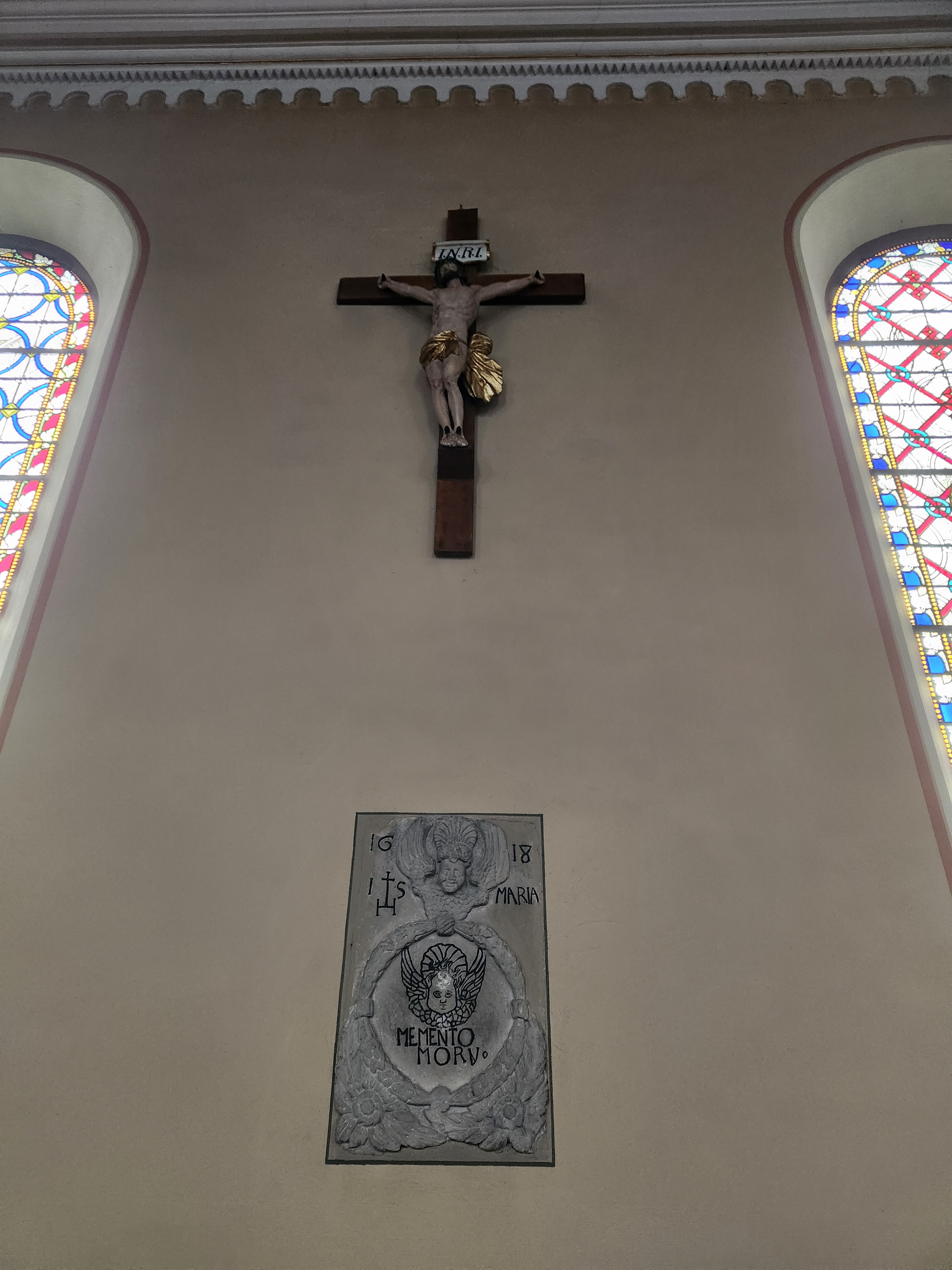
Tombstone surmounted by a crucifix

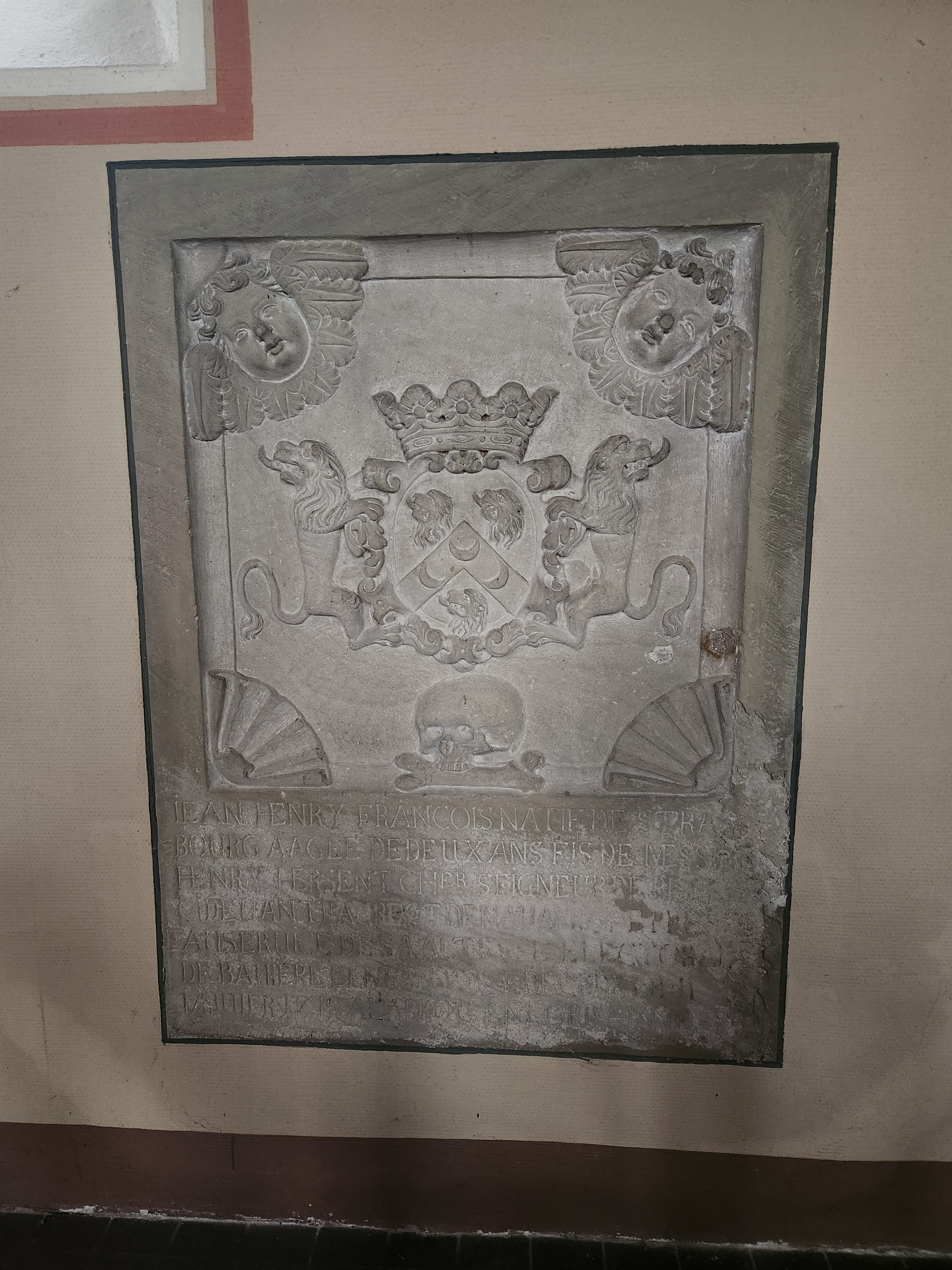
Funerary wall plaque

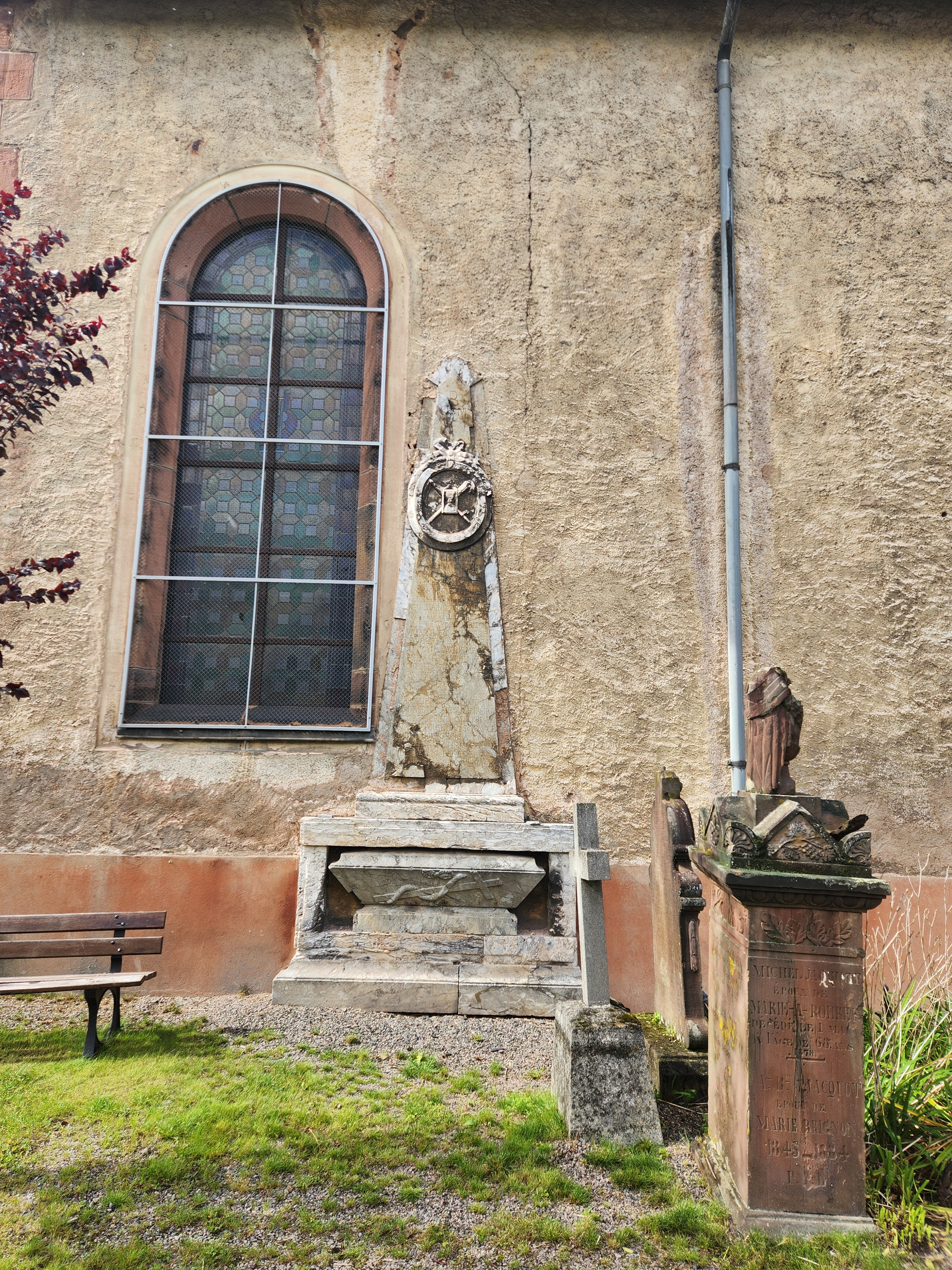
18th‑century funerary monument

== Parish life ==
The church has long been the centre of local religious life and notably hosted the Corpus Christi processions, with richly decorated reposoirs and the presence of the verger (suisse d’église) and the “little verger”.

The Cercle Aloysia of La Broque, founded in 1921, long animated parish life through music and youth activities.

== Notable parish priests ==
- Jean‑François Prêcheur (1825–1877): brought relics of Saint Libaire in 1852 with the authorization of Bishop Louis-Marie Caverot of Saint‑Dié
- Antoine Rapp (1913–1924): parish priest during the First World War
- Antoine Halbwachs (1924–1951)
- Lucien Friederich (1951–1974): parish priest at the 1961 consecration, organizer of pilgrimages (Lisieux, 1960)
- Léon Wassler (1984)
- Jean Chamley (1994)

== Saint Libaire ==
Saint Libaire, sister of Saint Elophe, was a Lorraine martyr beheaded in 362 at Grand under Julian the Apostate. Venerated from the 15th century in the County of Salm, she is invoked against storms and nervous diseases.

She is represented by a polychrome statue on the left side altar. Her relics are preserved in Grand, but part of them were brought to La Broque in 1852 by parish priest Prêcheur, with the authorization of Bishop Caverot. Her feast day is celebrated on 8 October.

== Surroundings ==
A stone calvary representing the Crucifixion stands on Place Sainte‑Libaire, near the church. It is a spiritual and heritage landmark of the village.

The church is surrounded by a cemetery enclosed by sandstone walls, landscaped, where several priests and notable families are buried. Attested since the 19th century and mentioned in the Mérimée inventory, it preserves several funerary monuments listed in the Palissy inventory.

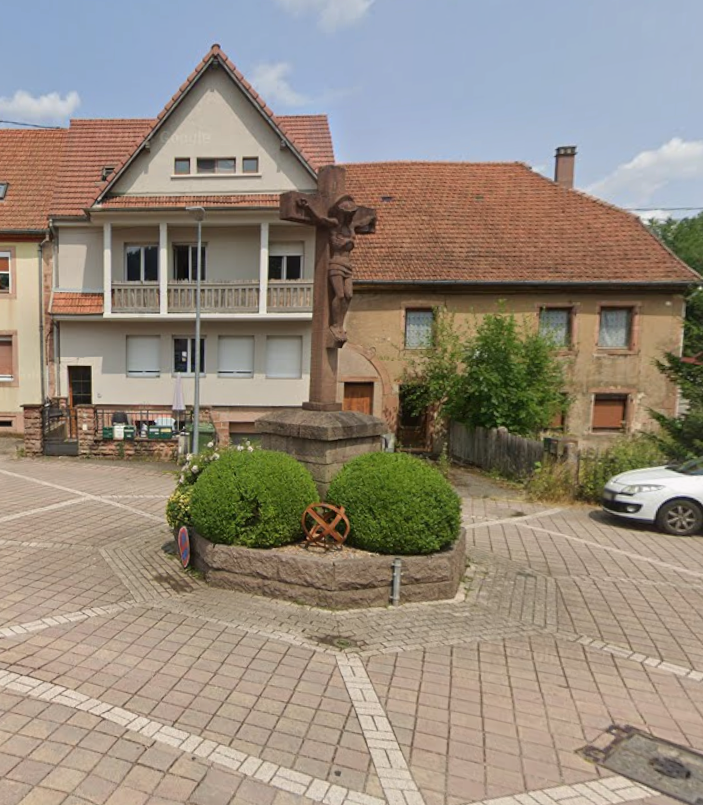
Calvary on Place Sainte‑Libaire (2023)

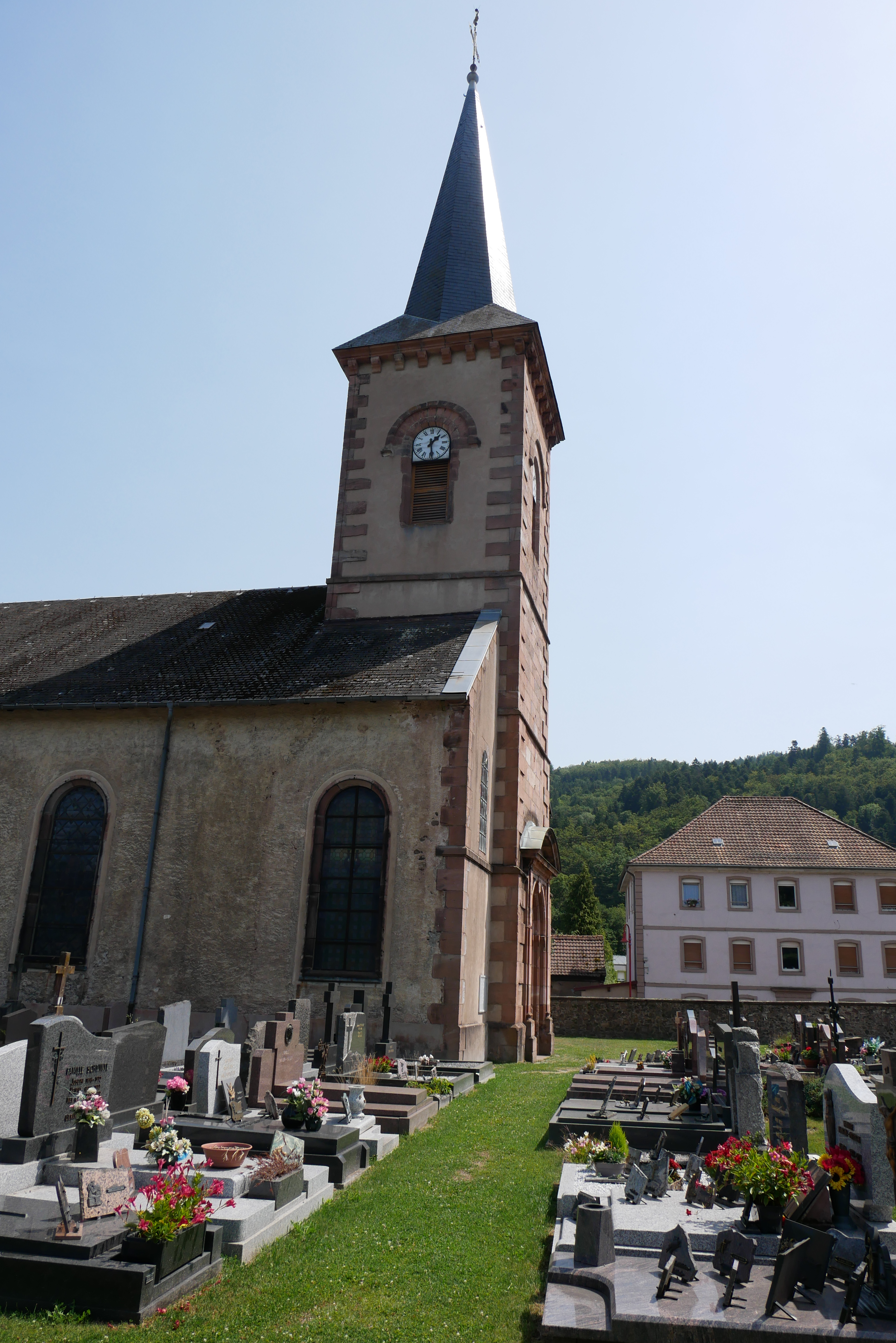
Cemetery adjoining the church

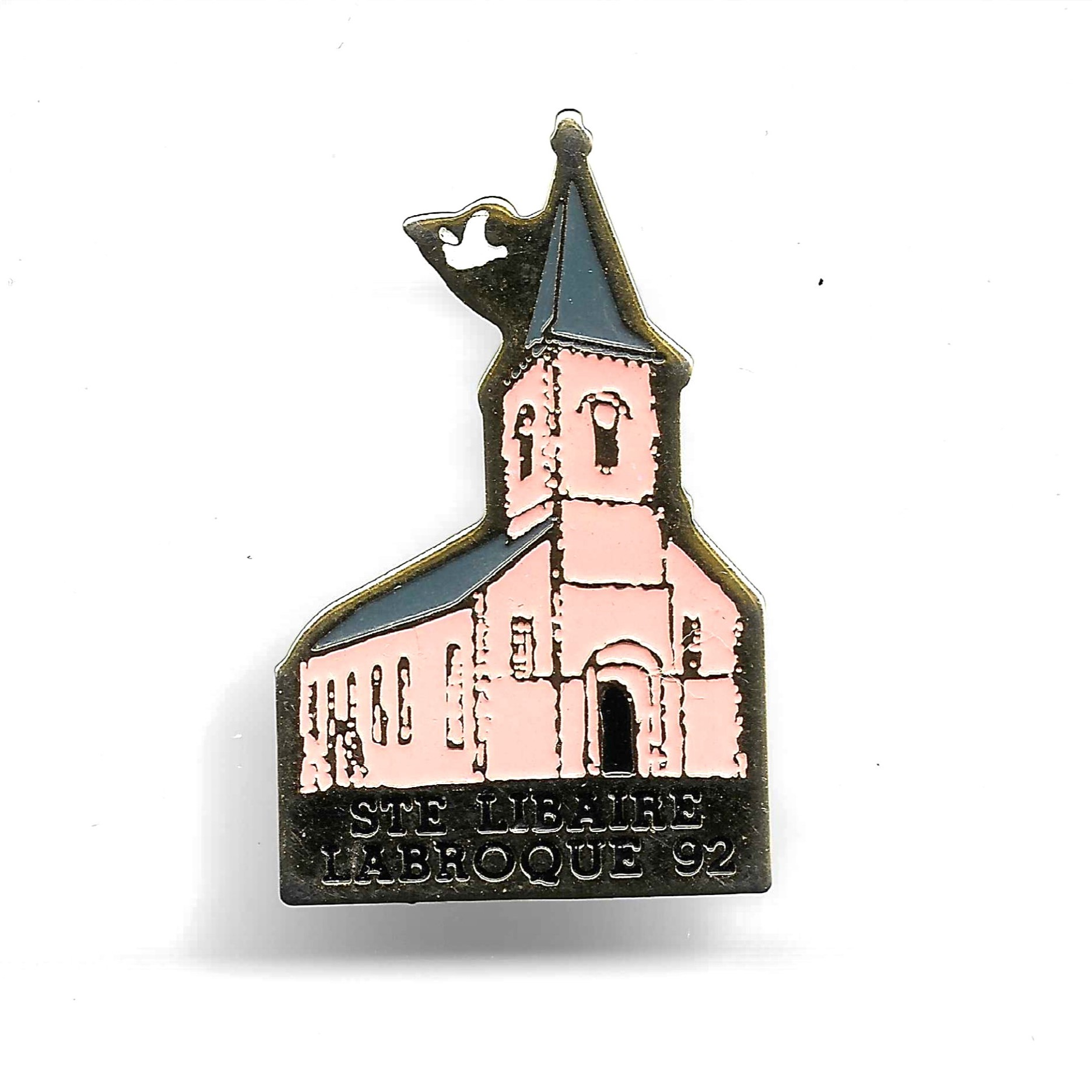
Commemorative pin (1992) depicting the church

== Popular memory ==
Parish memory is also expressed through commemorative objects. In 1992, a pin depicting the church was issued.

== See also ==
- Senones Abbey
