= Saint-Dié Cathedral =

Cathedral in Saint-Dié-des-Vosges, France

Coordinates: 48°17′20″N 6°57′3″E

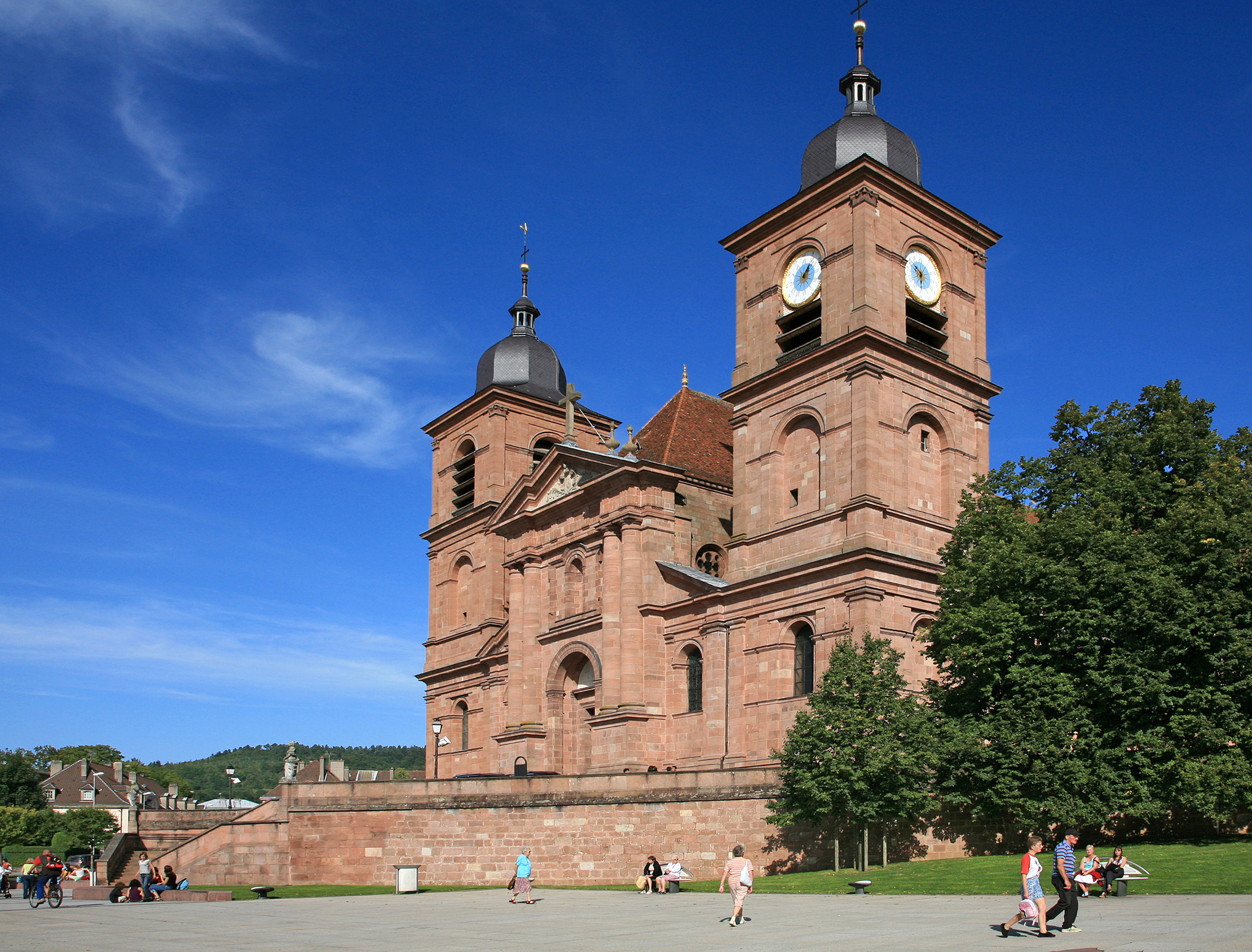
Saint-Dié Cathedral

Saint-Dié Cathedral (French: Cathédrale Saint-Dié de Saint-Dié-des-Vosges) is a Roman Catholic church and monument historique of France, located in the town of Saint-Dié-des-Vosges in Lorraine.

The cathedral, formerly a collegiate church, is dedicated to Saint Deodatus of Nevers. Since 1777 it has been the seat of the Bishop of Saint-Dié.

== Building description ==
The cathedral, like most of the town, is built largely of the local red sandstone. It has a Romanesque nave (12th century) and a Gothic choir; the portal of red stone dates from the 18th century. A fine cloister (13th century), containing a stone pulpit, communicates with the Petite-Église or Notre-Dame de Galilée, a well-preserved specimen of Romanesque architecture (12th century).

== History ==
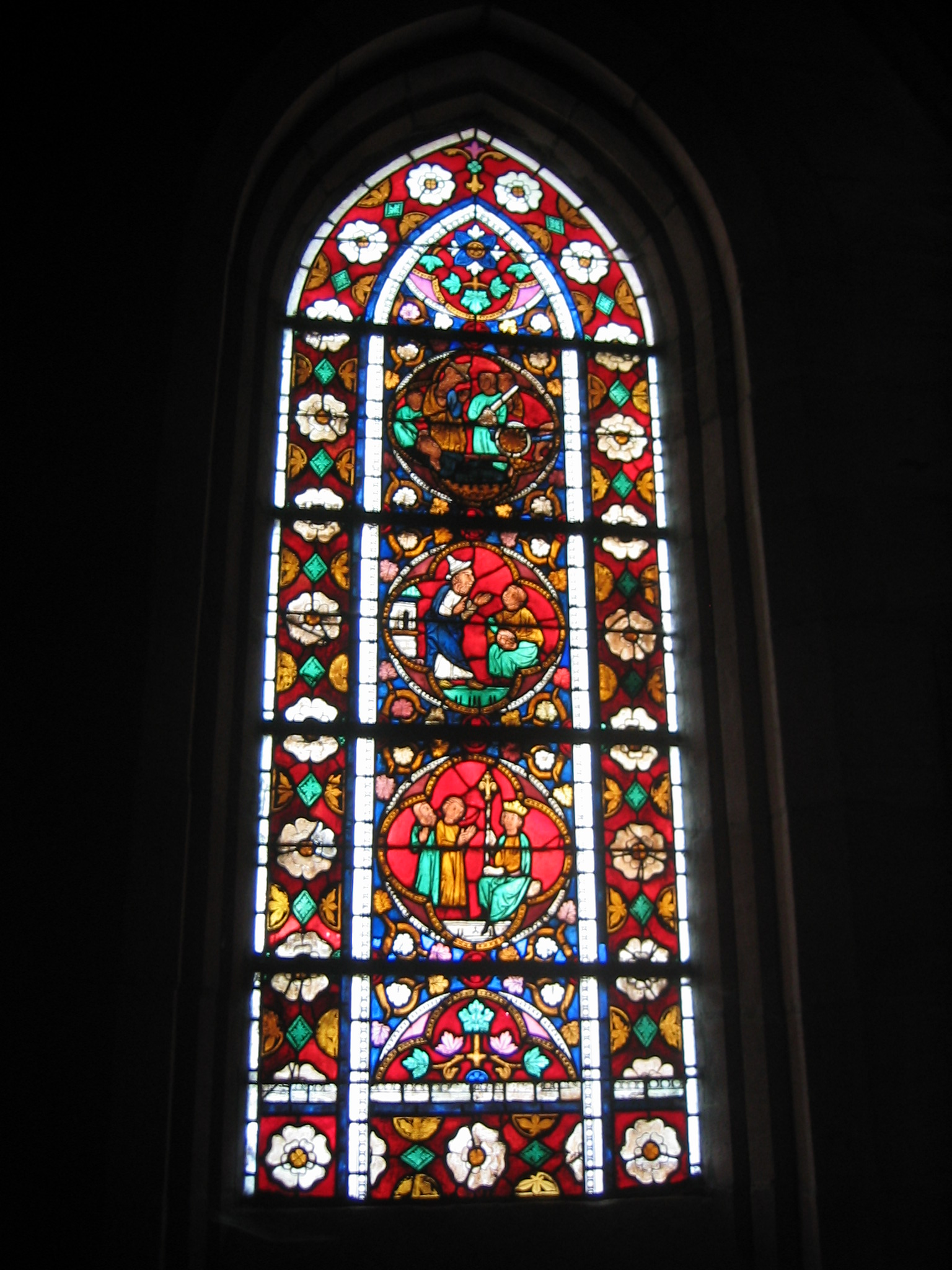
13th century stained glass

Deodatus of Nevers, the eponymous Saint Dié, founded a monastery here in the 7th century and gave up his episcopal functions to retire to this place.

In the 10th century the community became a chapter of Canons. Among those who subsequently held the rank of provost or dean were Giovanni de Medici, afterwards Pope Leo X, and several princes of the ducal House of Lorraine. Among the extensive privileges enjoyed by them was that of coining money.

Though they co-operated in building the town walls, the canons and the dukes of Lorraine soon became rivals for authority over the town of Saint-Dié, where towards the end of the 15th century one of the earliest printing presses of Lorraine was founded. The institution of a town council in 1628, and the establishment in 1777 of the bishopric which appropriated part of their spiritual jurisdiction, contributed greatly to diminish the influence of the canons; and with the French Revolution they were completely swept away. Their church remains as the cathedral.
