= Louis-Augustin Marmottin =

French Catholic bishop

- Archbishop of Reims
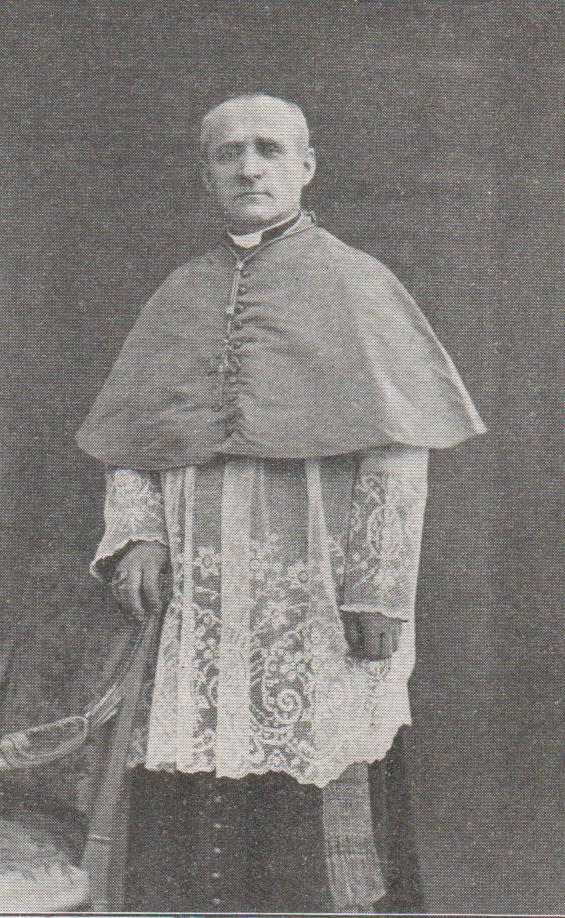
- Church: Catholic Church
- Archdiocese: Archdiocese of Reims
- In office: 21 August 1940 – 9 May 1960
- Predecessor: Emmanuel Célestin Suhard
- Successor: François Marty
- Previous post: Bishop of Saint-Dié (1930-1940)

Orders
- Ordination: 17 December 1898
- Consecration: 2 October 1930 by Joseph Tissier

Personal details
- Born: 11 March 1875 La Neuville-au-Pont, Marne, France
- Died: 9 May 1960 (aged 85)
- Coat of arms

Louis-Augustin Marmottin (March 11, 1875 at La Neuville-au-Pont (Marne) – May 9, 1960 at Reims (Marne)) was a French Catholic bishop. He was Bishop of Saint-Dié from 1930 to 1940 and then Archbishop of Reims from 1940 to 1960.

== Formation ==
Louis-Augustin Marmottin was from a family of farmers of Marne. He completed secondary school studies at Saint-Étienne de Châlons-sur-Marne and then attended the grand seminary. He pursued higher studies at the Institut catholique de Paris from 1896 to 1898 and obtained a license in mathematics and a license in law.

== Priest ==
Louis-Augustin Marmottin was ordained a priest December 17, 1898 for the Diocese of Châlons.

== Bishop of Saint-Dié ==
In 1930, Louis-Augustin Marmottin was named Bishop of the Diocese of Saint-Dié. He was ordained in the Cathedral Saint-Étienne de Châlons on October 20, 1930.

He obtained from Pope Pius XI the title of minor basilica for the Church of Saint-Maurice d'Epinal in 1933 and for the Church of Sainte-Jeanne d'Arc du Bois-Chenu in Domrémy-la-Pucelle in 1939.

== Archbishop of Reims ==
He was named Archbishop of Reims on August 21, 1940, and took possession of the see on October 13, 1940.

He died May 9, 1960, after a long sickness and was interred in Reims Cathedral on 13.

== See also ==
- Diocese of Saint-Dié
- Archdiocese of Reims
- Archbishops of Reims

== Sources ==
- Ronsin, Albert, Les Vosgiens célèbres – Dictionnaire biographique illustré, Éditions Gérard Louis, Vagney, 1990, p. 249.
- Lévêque, Louis, Petite histoire religieuse des Vosges, Mirecourt, 1949, p. 139-140.
- Vie diocésaine de Saint-Dié, 1960, p. 139.
