= Diocese of Saint-Dié =

Catholic diocese in France

Coordinates: 48°10′15″N 6°27′00″E

Diocese of Saint-Dié Dioecesis Sancti Deodatiis Diocèse de Saint-Dié

Catholic
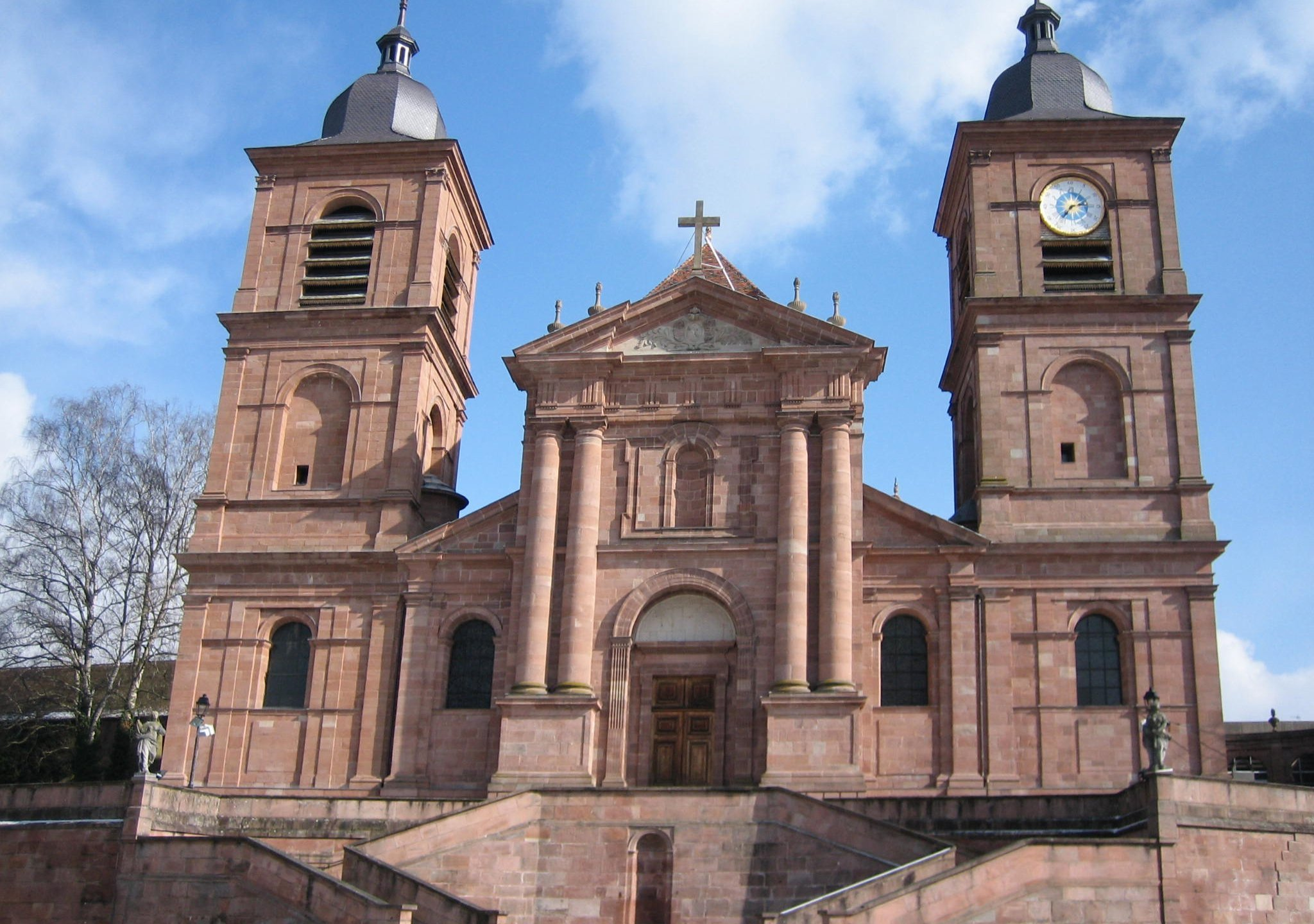
- Saint-Dié Cathedral

Location
- Country: France
- Ecclesiastical province: Besançon
- Metropolitan: Archdiocese of Besançon

Statistics
- Area: 5,903 km^{2} (2,279 sq mi)
- Population: Total; Catholics: (as of 2022); 359,520 ▼; 292,500 (est.) ▼ (81.4%)
- Parishes: 46

Information
- Denomination: Catholic
- Sui iuris church: Latin Church
- Rite: Roman Rite
- Established: 19 November 1777
- Cathedral: Saint-Dié Cathedral
- Patron saint: Saint Deodat
- Secular priests: 81 (Diocesan) ▲5 (Religious Orders) ▼28 Permanent Deacons ▼

Current leadership
- Pope: Leo XIV
- Bishop: François Gourdon
- Metropolitan Archbishop: Jean-Luc Bouilleret
- Bishops emeritus: Paul-Marie Joseph André Guillaume; Jean-Paul Mathieu

Map

Website
- Website of the Diocese

The Diocese of Saint-Dié (Latin: Dioecesis Sancti Deodatiis; French: Diocèse de Saint-Dié) is a Latin Church ecclesiastical territory or diocese of the Catholic Church in France. The diocese has the same boundaries as the département of the Vosges. The bishop's cathedra is Saint-Dié Cathedral in the town now named Saint-Dié-des-Vosges, but since 1944 has lived in Épinal, capital of the département. The Diocese of Saint–Dié is a suffragan diocese in the ecclesiastical province of the metropolitan Archdiocese of Besançon.

== History ==
The Diocese of Saint-Dié originated in the celebrated abbey of that name. Saint Deodatus (Dié) came, according his legendary biography, written in 1050, by Benedictine monks of Moyenmoutier, from Nevers and the Nivernais. He was believed to have been bishop of Nevers at one time.

According to the "Life of Saint Wlifrid" by Stephen of Ripon (Eddius Stephanus), a contemporary hagiography written not too much later than 710, the Saxon Wilfrid of York had been driven from his see due to the enmity of the Celtic bishops of Scotland toward his promotion of the practices of the Roman Church. He decided to go to Rome and seek papal protection from his enemies, and restoration to his diocese. He arrived on the continent in 678 and spent the winter in Frisia, but eventually found himself at the court of King Dagobert II, who invited him to stay in his kingdom and become bishop of Strasbourg. Wilfrid was anxious to seek vindication in Rome, however, and so the king assigned one of his bishops, Deodatus of Toul, to accompany him.

In Rome, Pope Agatho summoned a synod in October 679, precisely to deal with the disorders in the church in the British isles. Wilfrid was present, as was Bishop Deodatus. Both were invited to stay on in Rome, and they participated in the synod of May 680, which drafted a synodal letter which was sent to the Third Council of Constantinople, to which both affixed their signatures. Louis Duchesne agrees that this Bishop Deodatus (or Adeodatus) was the same as Saint Dié (Déodat), and that he was bishop in Toul, if not necessarily of Toul.

=== Questions about Saint Dié ===
The earliest reference to Deodatus occurs in the privilege granted by Bishop Numerianus of Trier in 667. Deodatus was already a bishop. The privilege states that Deodatus had already obtained from the fisc a piece of property in a remote and uncultivated place, called Galilee, at the confluence (Juncturae) of the Robache and the Meurthe rivers, and that he had built there a monastery, which accepted both permanent residents (monks) and temporary visitors (peregrini), and which used both the Rule of Saint Columba and the Rule of Saint Benedict. Bishop Numerianus and his suffragan bishops, Childulfus of Metz, Gisloaldus of Verdun, and Eborinus of Toul, approved Deodatus' monastery, and forbade anyone, prelate or king, to interfere with its operation. They also decreed that, on Deodatus' death, a successor abbot was to be chosen from among themselves by unanimous agreement of the entire congregation.

It is not known where Deodatus comes from. The "vita Deodati" indicates that he was a western Frank from the Nivernais. According to a hypothesis of some historians, however, he came from Ireland, which could be explained by a confusion in Latin between Niverniensis and Hiberniensis. Others scholars suggest that he might be a Christian who had travelled widely, and may have lived in the North of Britain's Islands. He has also been thought to have been educated too in Austrasia, by Scottish monks who followed the Rule of Saint Columbanus.

Legends relate that Diodotus made the acquaintance of Saints Arbogast and Florentius and walked with them through the passes of Alsace. The connections are anachronistic.

From Alsace, sometimes from the Heilige Wald, near Haguenau, he withdrew to the Vosges, sojourning at Romont where he began a lot of miracles, and Arentelle, where the inhabitants were hostile. For some time he was a solitary at Wilra or Wibra, maybe near the present Katzenthal in Alsace, but being persecuted by the inhabitants, he walked with a big stick who planted in soil created always a spring of water. Above the pass of Bonhomme, on the top of Rossberg, he launched an ironed arm until a locus called Petit-Saint-Dié under the Kemberg, a mountain, precisely under rocks Saint-Martin. Springs of flowed on this left side of the Meurthe, and he founded a refuge under rocks and near above springs. Once he received this lands in 669 he decided to work. His first monastery hardly built with new brothership, he was tied and dreamed to build a monastery in a little hill "Juncturae" in the right side of the river, the future Galilée. Longtime a prairie, then a little town, and now the center of Saint-Dié-des-Vosges stand between this two places.

=== Monastery ===
Before this time, Leudin Bodo, Bishop of Toul, had founded to the north-west of Saint-Dié the monastery of Bonmoutier for his daughter; and to the south of Bonmoutier the monastery of Etival, (c. 663). Saint Gondelbert, after resigning the Archbishopric of Sens, had just founded the abbey of Senones to the east, c. 661; in 1751 it became the capital of the principality of Salm. These four monasteries formed, by their geographical position, the four extremities of a cross. Later, Saint Hildulf, Bishop of Trier (d. 707), erected between them at the intersection of the two arms of the cross, the monastery of Moyenmoutier. In 967, the Emperor Otto II granted the bishops of Toul possession of the monasteries of Moyenmoutier and Galilee (Saint-Dié), with the right to coin money.

==== Grand Provost of Dié ====
In the 10th century the Abbey of Saint-Dié grew lax, and in 959 Frederick I, Duke of Lorraine, prompted by Archbishop Bruno of Trier, embarked on a reform of the monasteries in his duchy, assisted by Abbot Adelbert of Gorze. Adalbert entrusted the reform of the Abbey of Saint-Dié to the monk Erchemert, who quickly made a mess of its administration. The duke recalled Erchembert, and in 962 removed the Benedictines, replacing them by the Canons Regular of St. Augustine. Pope Gregory V, in 996, agreed to the change and decided that the grand prévôt, the principal dignitary of the abbey, should depend directly upon the Holy See, that is, not be subject to the jurisdiction of any local bishop.

In October 1049, Pope Leo IX visited Saint-Dié, and participated in the recognition and enshrining of the remains of Saint Deodatus. On 16 November 1049, he signed a bull, conceding privileges to Saint-Dié and confirming its possessions.

The canons of the collegiate church originally numbered twenty-four, and were headed by the dignities of Provost Major, Dean, Cantor, and Scholasticus.

===== Church and cathedral =====
The earliest remains on the site of the later cathedral, the two walls of the nave, date from the 8th and 10th centuries. In 1105, the duchess Beatrix contributed half the cost of restoring the crumbling church, as reparation for the excommunication of her husband Duke Ferri by the Chapter.

In 1065, both of the churches of Saint-Die were destroyed in a major fire. Rebuilding of the collegiate church began with the nave, which was begun in the middle of the 12th century, in the style called "Rhenish" or "Ottonian"; its vaults were completed and covered in wood at the beginning of the 13th century. At the beginning of the 14th century, the transepts and apses were added, and in the 15th and 16th twelve lateral chapels, which had the effect of reinforcing the 12th century walls. Between 1711 and 1715, the Italian architect Giovanni Betto added the façade.

The entire cathedral was destroyed by deliberately placed dynamite on the night of 16–17 November 1944. It was rebuilt, using a few salvaged elements, in the thirty years following the end of World War II, and consecrated on 28–29 September 1974, with the participation of Cardinal François Marty, Archbishop of Paris.

==== Seeking a bishopric ====
During the 17th century, profiting by the long vacancy of the see of Toul (1645–1656), the abbots of the several monasteries in the Vosges, without actually declaring themselves independent of the diocese of Toul, claimed to exercise a quasi-episcopal jurisdiction as to the origin of which, however, they were not agreed; in the eighteenth century they pretended to be nullius dioceseos. At the same time, the dukes of Lorraine, especially Charles V were eager to have a bishop in their own domains, rather than have themselves and their subjects dependent upon a bishop in another state, especially France, which had occupied Lorraine from 1634 to 1661 and again from 1670 to 1697. A new diocese in Lorraine was desired. Duke Charles proposed that Nancy be made a bishopric, but France opposed the initiative.

Leopold, Duke of Lorraine, was in favour of this step, but Louis XIV, and then the regent of Louis XV, Philippe d'Orleans (1715–1723), opposed it. To advance his interests, in 1716 the duke sent to Rome one of his trusted advisors, who had a gift for preaching and a literary reputation, as well as credentials in law and theology, Abbé Jean-Claude Sommier. In Rome, Sommier obtained a directive to the papal nuncio in Switzerland to conduct an inquiry into the circumstances surrounding Saint-Dié. He was sent to Rome again in 1718, where he conducted talks with cardinals and members of several Congregations at the papal court, and on 26 March 1719 he obtained a judgment in favor of the establishment of a diocese of Saint-Dié; but Pope Clement XI himself terminated the process, due to objections and threatened reprisals entered by the French minister. The pope was favorable to Sommier, however, and appointed him a protonotary apostolic. After Pope Innocent XIII was elected on 8 May 1721, Sommier was again sent to Rome to attempt to revive the plan for a diocese in Lorraine. While not agreeing to the plan, Innocent made Sommier an honorary chamberlain on 28 March 1722. When Innocent died in 1724, Sommier was sent to Rome again, to attempt to persuade the new Pope Benedict XIII. Benedict refused the plea to make Saint-Dié a bishopric, he did make Sommier an archbishop, of Caesarea in Palestine, on 29 January 1725, and consecrated the new archbishop himself on 11 February. According to Sommier himself, in his History of Dié, published in 1726, the pope granted him for life the administration of all the nullius dioceseos territories in Lorraine. Duke Leopold was satisfied with Sommier's work, and named him Grand Provost of the monastery of Dié. The city therefore had a bishop, even though it was not a diocese. He died on 5 October 1737.

The chapter of Saint-Dié immediately claimed that they had the right to elect Grand Provost Sommier's successor, which was hotly disputed by Duke Stanislaus. He appointed his own Grand-Almoner, Count Jozef Andrzej Zaluscki, and took steps to enthrone him personally. Zaluscki served only one year, most of it in absentia. His successor was appointed by King Louis XV in the person of the Bishop of Toul, Scipion-Jerome Begon (1723–1753), a determined opponent of the Chapter of Saint-Dié, which absolutely refused to receive him or enthrone him. They were defeated, however, by bulls of appointment obtained from the pope. Begon was succeeded by Dieudonné de Chaumont de Mareil, archdeacon and vicar-general of Metz, whose bulls are dated 31 December 1753; he was named titular bishop of Sion on 27 March 1765. His coadjutor and then successor was his nephew, Bartholomée Louis Martin de Chaumont de la Galasière, who became the first bishop of the diocese of Saint-Dié.

=== Diocese ===
In 1738, King Stanislaus of Poland was prevailed upon to give up the Polish throne in the Treaty of Vienna (1738), in exchange for which he received the duchies of Lorraine and Bar. On 29 March 1761, Duke Stanislaus granted the Grand-Provosts of Saint-Dié the domain of Saint-Dié, and with it the title of Comte de Saint-Dié. When he died in 1766, the duchies passed to his daughter Maria, who was the wife of Louis XV of France, and grandmother of Louis XVI. When she died in 1768, Lorraine became part of France. The diocese of Saint-Dié was erected on 21 July 1777, by Pope Pius VI and, as the other dioceses in Lorraine (the ancient dioceses of Toul, Verdun and Metz, and the new diocese of Nancy) was, until the French Revolution, suffragan of the Archdiocese of Trier. The territory consists of numerous monastic Vosgian territories and other lands, which had belonged to the Diocese of Toul.

The diocese was divided into two archdeaconries, that of Saint-Dié and that of Épinal.

By letters-patent of King Louis XVI, dated 6 February 1779, a seminary was created in Saint-Dié. Until it was ready for occupation, seminary students went to Nancy.

==== The French Revolution ====
Even before it directed its attention to the Church directly, the National Constituent Assembly attacked the institution of monasticism. On 13 February 1790. it issued a decree which stated that the government would no longer recognize solemn religious vows taken by either men or women. In consequence, Orders and Congregations which lived under a Rule were suppressed in France. Members of either sex were free to leave their monasteries or convents if they wished, and could claim an appropriate pension by applying to the local municipal authority.

The Assembly ordered the replacement of political subdivisions of the ancien régime with subdivisions called "departments", to be characterized by a single administrative city in the center of a compact area. The decree was passed on 22 December 1789, the boundaries fixed on 26 February 1790, with the institution to be effective on 4 March 1790. A new department was created called "Vosges," and Epinal was fixed as its administrative center. The National Constituent Assembly then, on 6 February 1790, instructed its ecclesiastical committee to prepare a plan for the reorganization of the clergy. At the end of May, its work was presented as a draft Civil Constitution of the Clergy, which, after vigorous debate, was approved on 12 July 1790. There was to be one diocese in each department, requiring the suppression of approximately fifty dioceses. The diocese of Vosges was assigned to the "Metropole de l'Est", with its metropolitan seated in Besançon. Unusually, the bishop of the diocese should have had his seat in Épinal, but in the case of Vosges it was allowed to remain in Saint-Dié.

In the Civil Constitution of the Clergy, the National Constituent Assembly also abolished cathedral chapters, canonicates, prebends, chapters and dignities of collegiate churches, chapters of both secular and regular clergy of both sexes, and abbeys and priories whether existing under a Rule or held in commendam.

Bishops and parish priests were to be elected, by the same carefully limited and selected bodies as elected the regional civil authorities. Since the legitimate Bishop Bartholomée Louis Martin de Chaumont refused to take the required oaths to the Civil Constitution of the Clergy and to the Constitution of Year III, he was deposed by the National Assembly, an act which the assembly was not canonically empowered to perform. An election was held at Épinal on 27 February 1791, which chose the director of the seminary, Mgr. Louis Demange, who declined; on March 1, therefore, the electors chose Jean-Antoine Maudru, the curé of Aydollies, who was consecrated in Paris on 21 March. He spent the period from Easter to October 1791 in Saint-Dié. During the Reign of Terror, Maudru was arrested as a counter-revolutionary and taken to Paris, where he was condemned to death. The deposition and execution of Robespierre on 9 Thermidor (27 July 1794) saved Maudru's life, though he was kept in prison for another six months before release.

==== Restoration ====
The French Directory fell in the coup engineered by Talleyrand and Napoleon on 10 November 1799. The coup resulted in the establishment of the French Consulate, with Napoleon as the First Consul. To advance his aggressive military foreign policy, he decided to make peace with the Catholic Church and the Papacy. On 29 November 1801, in the concordat of 1801 between the French Consulate, headed by First Consul Napoleon Bonaparte, and Pope Pius VII, the bishopric of Saint-Dié (Vosges) and all the other dioceses in France were suppressed. This removed all the institutional contaminations and novelties introduced by the Constitutional Church. The diocesan structure was then re-established, though the diocese of Saint-Dié was not revived.

The Concordat of 1817, between King Louis XVIII and Pope Pius VII, should have restored the diocese of Saint-Dié, by the bull "Commissa divinitus", but the French Parliament refused to ratify the agreement. It was not until 6 October 1822 that a revised version of the papal bull, "Paternae Charitatis" , and an ordonnance of Louis XVIII of 13 January 1823, received the consent of all parties.

The diocese of Saint-Dié became a suffragan of Besançon. According to a principle sanctioned by this last Concordat, the diocesan boundaries were realigned, to follow those of the civil department of the Vosges.

The Franco-German War, terminated by the peace Treaty of Frankfurt (1871), removed eighteen communes in the valley of the River Bruche from the department of the Vosges and the diocese of Saint-Dié, adding them respectively to Nieder-Elsass (Bas-Rhin) and the Diocese of Strasbourg.

Louis-Marie Caverot, Archbishop of Lyon (1876–1884), who was appointed a Cardinal by Pope Pius IX in 1877, had been Bishop of Saint-Dié from 1849 to 1876. As Bishop of Saint-Dié he held diocesan synods in 1864 and 1866, and published the statutes in 1867.

==== Religious of the diocese ====
Elizabeth de Ranfaing (born at Remiremont, 1592; died 1649) founded in the Diocese of Toul the congregation of Our Lady of Refuge;

Born at Saint-Dié, Catherine de Bar (1614–1698), known in religion as Mère Mechtilde of the Blessed Sacrament, was at first an Annunciade nun and then a Benedictine. She founded, at Paris in 1654, the Order of the Benedictine Nuns of Perpetual Adoration of the Blessed Sacrament.

Eizabeth Brem (1609–68), known as Mother Benedict of the Passion, a Benedictine nun at Rambervillers, established in that monastery the Institute of the Perpetual Adoration. Venerable Jean-Martin Moye (1730–1793), founder in Lorraine of the Congrégation de la Providence for the instruction of young girls and apostle of Sichuan, was director for a brief period of the seminary of Saint-Dié, and established at Essegney, in the diocese, one of the first novitiates of the Soeurs de la Providence (hospitallers and teachers), whose mother-house at Portieux ruled over a large number of houses before the Law of 1901. The Congregation of the Soeurs du Divin-Redempteur was authorized in 1854, and had its mother-house at Épinal.

Eugène Grandclaude, a village teacher who was sent to the Roman College in 1857 by Bishop Caverot, contributed, when a professor in the grand seminaire of Saint-Dié, to the revival of canon law studies in France, with his Jus canonicum juxta ordinem Decretalium. He became director of the seminary in 1882, and served until 1897. He was made a canon and Dean of the cathedral Chapter. He died in 1900.

==== Religious institutions in the diocese up to 1905 ====
There were in the diocese before the application of the Law of 1901 (Association loi de 1901), directed toward congregations: Augustianian Canons Regular of the Lateran; the Clerks Regular of Our Saviour; the Eudistes; the Franciscans, the Congregation of the Holy Ghost and the Holy Heart of Mary and various teaching orders of brothers. A number of these refused, or were unable, to comply with the provisions of the law, and had to leave France. Among the congregations of nuns founded in the diocese may be mentioned the Soeurs de l'Instruction chrétienne de la Providence, the Soeurs du Pauvre Enfant Jésus (also known as the Soeurs de la bienfaisance chrétienne), teachers and hospitallers, founded in 1854 at Chemoy l'Orgueilleux; the mother-house was transferred to Remiremont.

At the close of the nineteenth century the religious congregations in the diocese directed 7 créchés, 55-day nurseries, 1 orphanage for boys and girls; 19 girls' orphanages, 13 workshops, 1 house of refuge; 4 houses for the assistance of the poor, 36 hospitals or hospices, 11 houses of nuns devoted to the care of the sick in their own homes and 1 insane asylum. The diocese of Saint-Dié had in 1905 (at the time of the rupture of the Concordat), 421,104 inhabitants in 32 parishes, 354 succursal parishes and 49 vicariates supported by the State.

==== Saints of the diocese ====
The following persons are honoured in the Diocese of Saint-Dié:

- Sigebert III, Merovingian King of Austrasia (630–656)
- Saint Germain, a hermit near Remiremont, a martyr, who died Abbot of Grandval, near Basel (618–670)
- Saint Hunna, a penitent at Saint-Dié (d. about 672)
- Saint Modesta, a nun at Remiremont, afterwards foundress and abbess of the monastery of Horren at Trier (seventh century)
- Saint Simeon, Bishop of Metz (eighth century), whose relics are preserved at Senones
- Saint Goéry, Bishop of Metz (d. about 642), whose relics are preserved at Epinal and who is the patron of the butchers of the town
- Saint William and Saint Achery, hermits near Ste. Marie aux Mines
- Richardis (wife of Charles the Fat), who died as Abbess of Andlau in Alsace
- Blessed Joan of Arc, b. at Domrémy in the diocese
- Saint Pierre Fourier (b. at Méricourt, 1565; d. 1640), curé of Mattaincourt, who founded the Order of Notre-Dame
- Venerable Mére Alix le Clerc (b. at Remiremont, 1576; d. 1622)

==== Pilgrimages of the diocese ====
The principal pilgrimages of the diocese are: Notre-Dame de Saint-Dié, at Saint-Dié, at the place where Saint Dié erected his first sanctuary; Notre-Dame du Trésor, at Remiremont; Notre-Dame de Consolation, at Epinal; Notre-Dame de la Brosse, at Bains; Notre-Dame de Bermont, southwest of Nancy at Greux, near Domrémy, the sanctuary at which Joan of Arc prayed.

The tomb of Saint Peter Fourier, CRSA (1565–1640), who was born at Mirecourt (Lorraine), is found at Mattaincourt, the parish in which he first undertook his priestly duties. The remains of Brother Joseph Formet (1724–1784), a native of Lomont (Haute-Saône), known as the hermit of Ventron (Vosges), are the object of a pilgrimage.

== Bishops ==
- Bartholomée Louis Martin de Chaumont de la Galasière (1777–1801)

Constitutional Church

- Jean-Antoine Maudru (1791–1801)

The diocese was suppressed in 1801; erected again in 1817

[ * Augustin-Louis de Montblanc (1817–1821), never consecrated ]

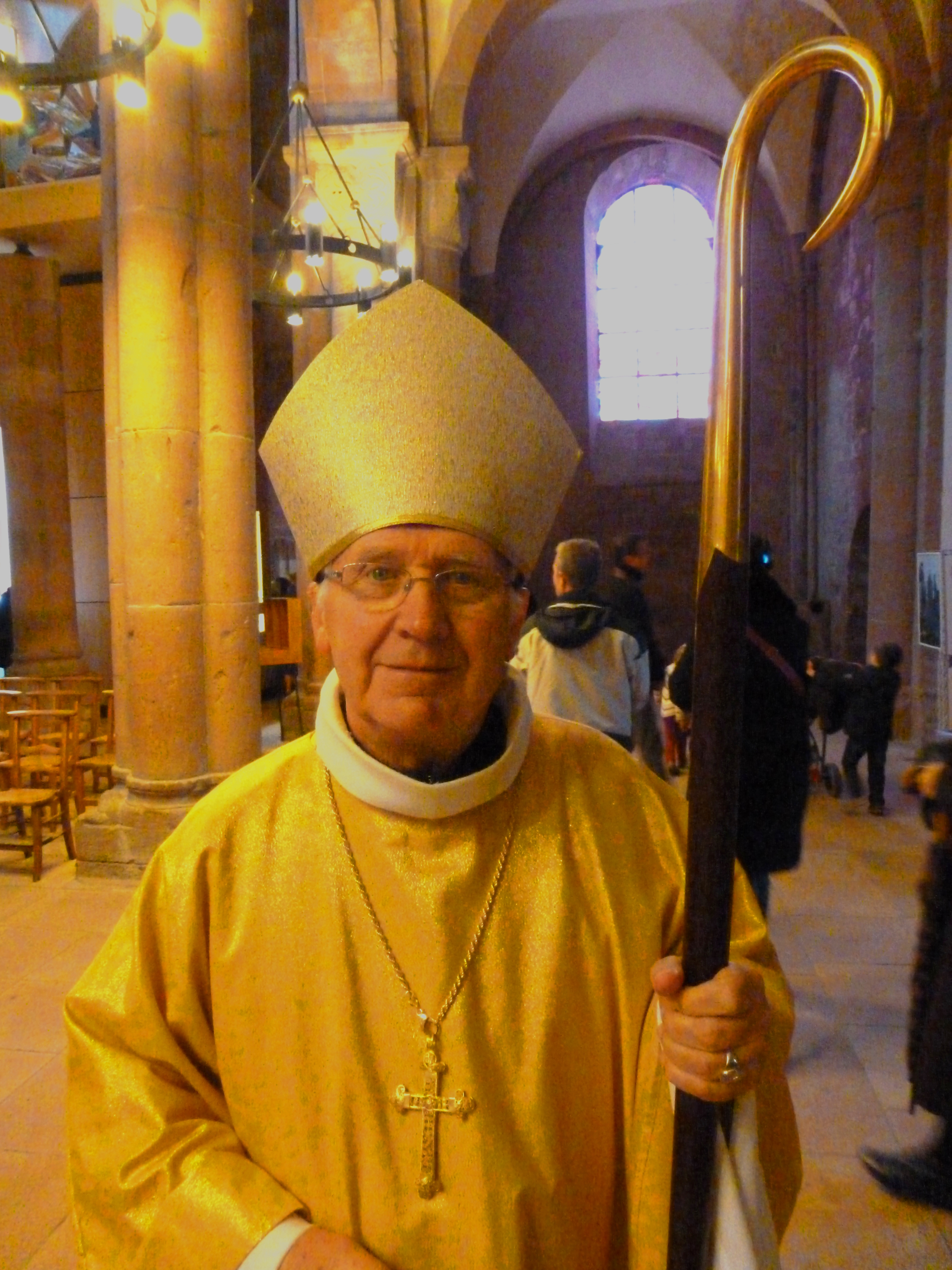
Bishop Jean-Paul Mary Mathieu

- Jacques-Alexis Jacquemin (1823–1830)
- Jacques-Marie-Antoine-Célestin du Pont (9 May 1830 – 1835)
- Jean-Joseph-Marie-Eugène de Jerphanion (1 May 1835 – 1842
- Jean-Nicaise Gros (15 Jul 1842 – 1844)
- Daniel-Victor Manglard (21 Apr 1844 – 1849)
- Louis-Marie Caverot (16 Mar 1849 – 1876
- Albert-Marie-Camille de Briey (20 Apr 1876 – 10 Nov 1888 Died)
- Etienne-Marie-Alphonse Sonnois (21 Dec 1889 – 1892
- Alphonse-Gabriel-Pierre Foucault (3 Jan 1893 – 28 May 1930 Died)
- Louis-Augustin Marmottin (2 Aug 1930 – 1940)
- Emile-Arsène Blanchet (6 Oct 1940 – 10 Oct 1946 Resigned)
- Henri-René-Adrien Brault (29 Sep 1947 – 11 Jul 1964 Died)
- Jean-Félix-Albert-Marie Vilnet (24 Sep 1964 – 1983)
- Paul-Marie Joseph André Guillaume (29 Oct 1984 – 14 Dec 2005 Retired)
- Jean-Paul Mary Mathieu (14 Dec 2005 – 15 June 2016 Retired)
- Didier Berthet (2016–2023)

== Sources ==
- Duchesne, Louis (1915). Fastes episcopaux de l'ancienne Gaule. Vol. III: Les provinces du Nord et de l'Est. (in French). Paris: A. Fontemoing, 1915.
- Gams, Pius Bonifatius (1873). Series episcoporum Ecclesiae catholicae: quotquot innotuerunt a beato Petro apostolo (in Latin). Ratisbon: Typis et Sumptibus Georgii Josephi Manz. p. 617.
- Glez, Gaston (1908), "La Chaire Vosgienne sous l'ancien Régime," (in French), in: Bulletin de la Société philomatique vosgienne, Volume 33 (Saint-Dié: C. Cuny, 1908), pp. 5–114, at pp. 25–33.
- Gravier, N. F. (1836). Histoire De La Ville Episcopale Et De L'Arrondissement De Saint-Die. Epinal: Gerard, 1836.
- Lahache, Antoine. Société bibliographique (1907). L'épiscopat français depuis le Concordat jusqu'à la Séparation (1802–1905). (in French). Paris: Librairie des Saints-Pères, 1907. pp. 558–567.
- Lepage, Henri; Charton, Charles (1845). Le département des Vosges: statistique historique et administrative. (in French). Volume 2. Nancy: Peiffer, 1845. pp. 446–456.
- Martin, Eugène (1903). Histoire des diocèses de Toul, de Nancy & de Saint-Dié. (in French). Nancy: A. Crépin-Leblond, 1903. Vol. 3: Du démembrement en trois diocèses à la modification des circonscriptions diocésaines après la guerre Franco-allemande.
- Mason, Frank H. (1892). "The Baptismal Font of America," in: Harper's New Monthly Magazine Vol. 85, no. 509 (New York: October 1892), pp. 651–669.
- Payen, Joseph-Eugène (1911). "Jean-Claude Sommier, conseiller d'État, conseiller prélat à la cour de Lorraine, grand prévôt de l'église de Saint-Dié, archevêque de Césarée," (in French), in: Procès-verbaux et mémoires. Académie des sciences, belles-lettres et arts de Besançon, (Besançon: P. Jacquin., 1911), pp. 34–63.
- Pfister, Charles (1888). "Les Revenus de la collégiale de Saint-Dié, à la fin du X^{e} siècle," in: Annales de l'Est vol. 2 (Nancy: Derger-Levrault, 1888), pp. 514–542.
- Pfister, Charles (1889). "Les légendes de saint Die et de saint Hidulphe," (in French), in: Annales de l'Est vol. 3 (Nancy: Derger-Levrault, 1889), pp. 377–408; 536–588.
- Pisani, Paul (1907). Répertoire biographique de l'épiscopat constitutionnel (1791–1802) (in French). Paris: A. Picard et fils.</r
- Ritzler, Remigius; Sefrin, Pirminus (1958). Hierarchia catholica medii et recentis aevi (in Latin). Vol. VI (1730-1799). Patavii: Messagero di S. Antonio. p. 193.
- Ritzler, Remigius; Sefrin, Pirminus (1968). Hierarchia Catholica medii et recentioris aevi (in Latin). Vol. VII (1800–1846). Monasterii: Libr. Regensburgiana.
- Remigius Ritzler; Pirminus Sefrin (1978). Hierarchia catholica Medii et recentioris aevi (in Latin). Vol. VIII (1846–1903). Il Messaggero di S. Antonio.
- Pięta, Zenon (2002). Hierarchia catholica medii et recentioris aevi (in Latin). Vol. IX (1903–1922). Padua: Messagero di San Antonio. ISBN 978-88-250-1000-8.
- Valance, Roger (ed.). La dédicace et la consécration de la cathédrale Saint-Dié, 28-29 septembre 1974: Deuxième centenaire du diocèse, 26-27 novembre 1977. (in French). Saint-Dié: Diocèse de Saint-Dié, 1974.
