= Paul-Marie Guillaume =

French Catholic bishop (born 1929)

His Excellency Paul-Marie Joseph André Guillaume
- Bishop Emeritus of Saint-Dié
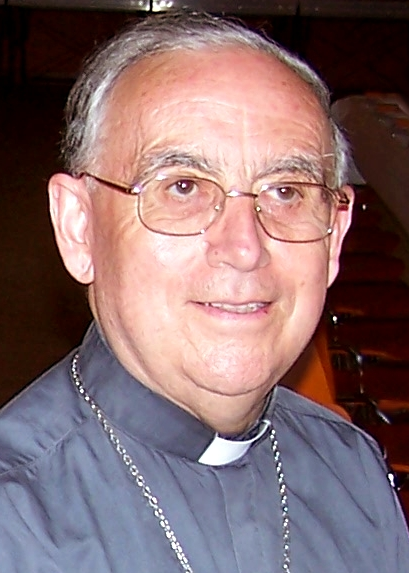
- Church: Catholic Church
- Diocese: Saint-Dié
- Appointed: 29 October 1984
- Term ended: 14 December 2005
- Predecessor: Jean-Félix-Albert-Marie Vilnet
- Successor: Jean-Paul Mathieu

Orders
- Ordination: 9 April 1955
- Consecration: 9 December 1984

Personal details
- Born: 31 October 1929 (age 96) Dunkirk, France

Paul-Marie Joseph André Guillaume (born 31 October 1929) is a French Catholic prelate, who served as Bishop of Saint-Dié from 1984 until his retirement in 2005.

== Biography ==
=== Early life and priesthood ===
Guillaume was born on 31 October 1929 in Dunkirk, in the Nord department of France. He was ordained a priest on 9 April 1955.

=== Episcopal ministry ===
On 29 October 1984, Pope John Paul II appointed him Bishop of Saint-Dié. He was consecrated bishop on 9 December 1984.

His resignation as diocesan bishop was accepted by Pope Benedict XVI on 14 December 2005, upon reaching the canonical retirement age. He then assumed the title of Bishop Emeritus of Saint-Dié.
