= Louis-Marie Caverot =

French prelate

His Eminence Louis-Marie Caverot
- Archbishop of Lyon
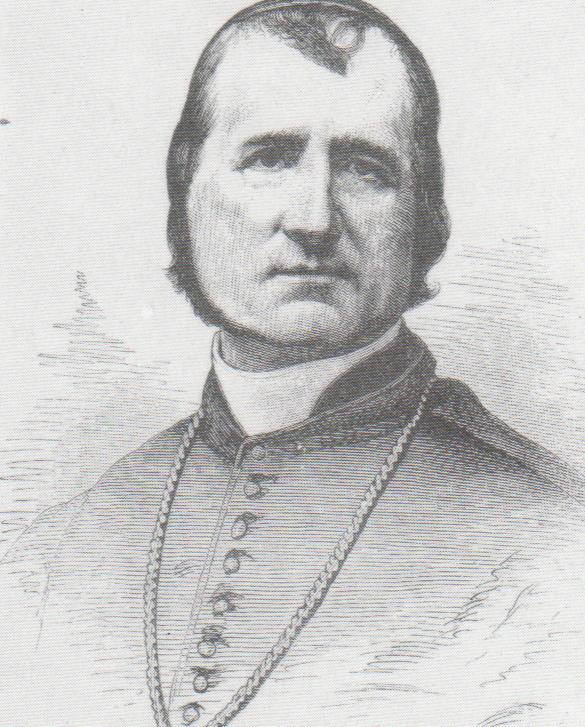
- Church: Roman Catholic Church
- Archdiocese: Lyon
- See: Lyon
- Appointed: 26 July 1876
- Term ended: 23 January 1887
- Predecessor: Jacques-Marie-Achille Ginoulhiac
- Successor: Joseph-Alfred Foulon
- Other post: Cardinal-Priest of Santissima Trinità al Monte Pincio (1884-87)
- Previous posts: Bishop of Saint-Dié (1849-76); Cardinal-Priest of San Silvestro in Capite (1877-84)

Orders
- Ordination: 19 March 1831
- Consecration: 22 July 1849 by Jacques-Marie-Adrien-Césaire Mathieu
- Created cardinal: 12 March 1877 by Pope Pius IX
- Rank: Cardinal-Priest

Personal details
- Born: Louis-Marie-Joseph-Eusèbe Caverot; 26 May 1806 Joinville, First French Empire
- Died: 23 January 1887 (aged 80) Lyon, French Third Republic
- Parents: Claude Marie Caverot; Anne-Marguerite Noël
- Motto: Dilectione et pace
- Coat of arms

Louis-Marie Caverot (French pronunciation: [lwi maʁi kavʁo]; 26 May 1806 – 23 January 1887) was a French prelate of the Catholic Church who became a bishop in 1849 and served as Archbishop of Lyon from 1876 to 1887. He was raised to the rank of cardinal in 1877.

== Biography ==
Louis-Marie Caverot was born on 26 May 1806 in Joinville. He studied at the colleges of Troyes, Dôle and Saint-Acheul, then studied law and worked for a time at the Ministry of War. He entered the Saint Sulpice Seminary in 1828. He was ordained a priest on 19 March 1831, became vicar at the cathedral of Besançon and then canon-archpriest in 1835. In poor health, he was made chaplain of several religious communities. He was appointed vicar general of the Archdiocese of Besançon in 1846.

On 26 March 1849, Caverot was appointed Bishop of Saint-Dié, he received his episcopal consecration on 22 July and was installed on 5 August. When the railway arrived in 1864, he acquired and saved the chapel of Petit-Saint-Dié, believed to be a seventh-century place of Christian worship. He also supported the founding of several religious congregations.

He participated in the First Vatican Council in 1870 and voted in favour of papal infallibility.

He became Archbishop of Lyon in 1876. On 12 May 1877, Pope Pius IX made him a Cardinal-Priest of San Silvestro in Capite, which he resigned in 1884 to take the title of Trinità al Monte Pincio. He participated in the 1878 conclave that elected Pope Leo XIII. In Lyon, he reorganized the diocesan administration and worked to support Catholic education at all levels in light of the laws of 1881.

In 1885, he urged Catholics not to attend performances of Jules Massenet's opera Herodiade, for which a 21st-century musicologist labels him a "reactionary cleric".

He died in Lyon on 23 January 1887.
