= La Neuville-au-Pont =

Neuville-au-Pont
- Commune
- Location of Neuville-au-Pont
- Location within France Location within Grand Est
- Coordinates: 49°07′28″N 4°51′31″E
- Country: France
- Region: Grand Est
- Department: Marne
- Arrondissement: Châlons-en-Champagne
- Canton: Argonne Suippe et Vesle
- Intercommunality: Argonne Champenoise

Government
  - Mayor (2020–2026): Franck Zentner
- Area^{1}: 15.11 km^{2} (5.83 sq mi)
- Elevation: 136 m (446 ft)
- Population (2023): 463
  - Density: 30.6/km^{2} (79.4/sq mi)
- Time zone: UTC+01:00 (CET)
  - Summer (DST): UTC+02:00 (CEST)
- INSEE/Postal code: 51399 /51800
- ^{1} French Land Register data, which excludes lakes, ponds, glaciers > 1 km^{2} (0.386 sq mi or 247 acres) and river estuaries.

La Neuville-au-Pont (French pronunciation: [la nøvil o pɔ̃]) is a commune in the Marne department in the Grand Est region in north-eastern France.

== See also ==
- Communes of the Marne department
