= Deodatus of Nevers =

Bishop of Nevers

Saint Deodatus of Nevers
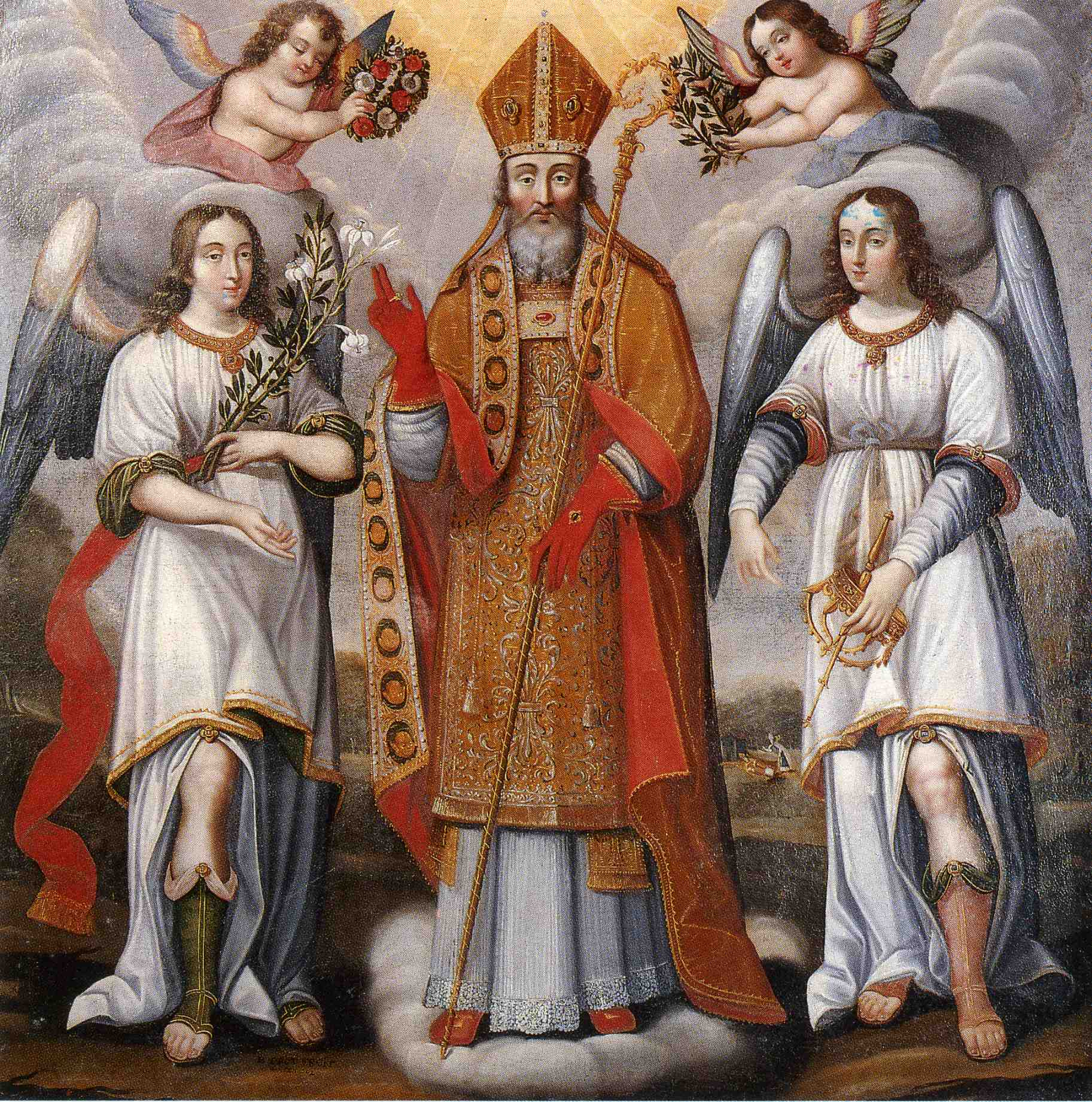
- The Glorification of Deodatus
- Born: possibly Ireland
- Died: 679 AD
- Venerated in: Eastern Orthodox Church; Roman Catholic Church
- Canonized: 1049 by Pope Leo IX
- Feast: June 19
- Attributes: depicted with hand stretching to thunder clouds
- Patronage: invoked for rain, and against thunderstorm, evil spirits, and plague

Deodatus (Dié, Didier, Dieudonné, Déodat, Adéodat) of Nevers (d. June 19, ca. 679 AD) was a bishop of Nevers from 655.

== Exploits ==
Deodatus was born about 590 to an illustrious family of western France. In 655 Deodatus was appointed bishop of Nevers. He attended the Council of Sens in 657.

In 664 he resigned his see, having recommended to his clergy the choice of a successor. He made the acquaintance of Saints Arbogast and Florentius and walked the mountain passes to the Forest of Haguenau where he led an eremitical life. He baptized the son of Saint Hunna (Una), who was also named Deodatus and who is also venerated as a saint. Hunna's son became a monk at Ebersheim.

Later he retired deeper into the Vosges. Hun, lord of the Val de Galilee, bestowed on him some territory, which donation was confirmed by King Childeric II. There he established the monastery Juncturae (Jointures). He placed Jointures under the Rule of Saint Columban, later replaced by the Rule of Saint Benedict.

Tradition states that he died in the arms of Saint Hidulphus, bishop of Treves.

== Veneration ==
The town of Saint-Dié grew up around the monastery of Jointures. However, some sources connect the name with an earlier saint, Deodatus of Blois (d. 525).

He is invoked as the patron saint for rain, and against thunderstorms, evil spirits, and plague.

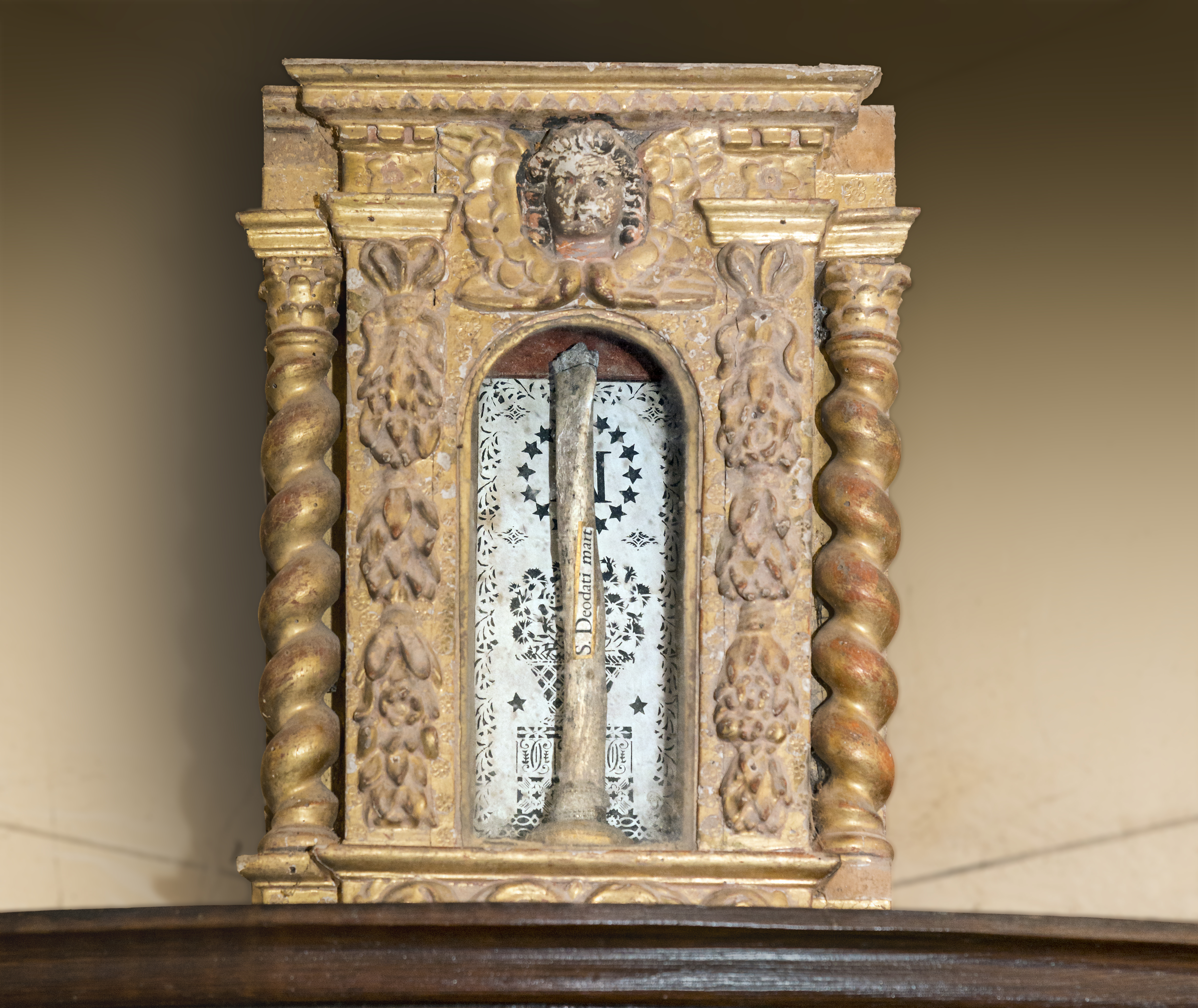
Relicary of Deodatus of Nevers

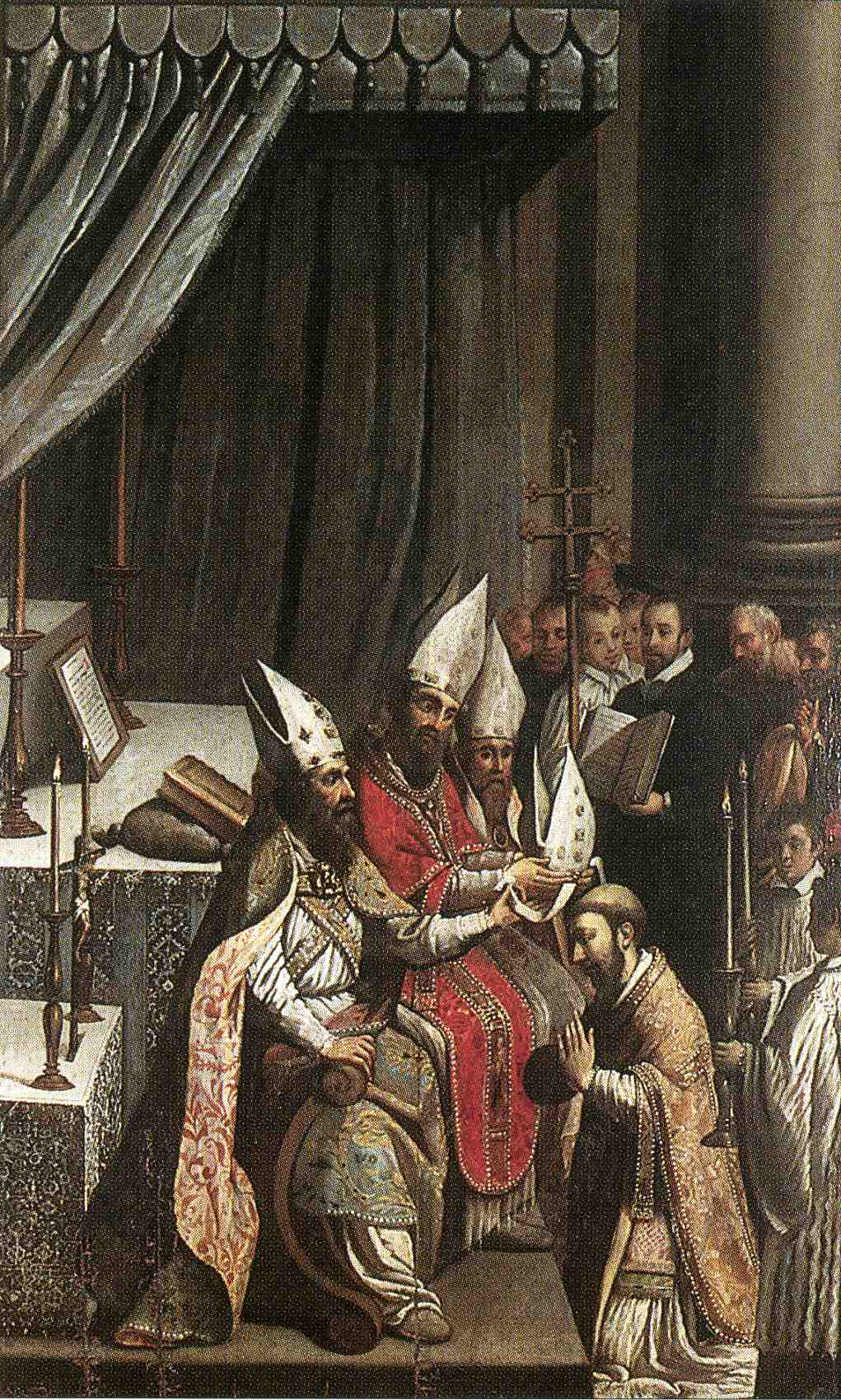
The Consecration of Deodatus

== Sources ==
- Papenbroch, Daniel van (1701), "De Sancto Deodato, primum episcopo Nivernensi," in: Acta Sanctorum Junii, (in Latin) Volume 3 (Antwerp: Apud Viduam Henrici Thieullier, 1701), pp. 869-884.
- Pfister, Charles (1889). "Les légendes de saint Die et de saint Hidulphe," (in French), in: Annales de l'Est vol. 3 (Nancy: Derger-Levrault, 1889), pp. 377-408; 536–588.
