= Saint Hippolyte's Priory =

Priory in Haut-Rhin, France

St. Hippolyte's Priory was a Benedictine priory in the village of Saint-Hippolyte in the Haut-Rhin department, Alsace, France.

It was founded in 760, on an estate then called Audoaldovillare, by Saint Fulrad, a powerful politician, diplomat, landowner and churchman, also abbot of St. Denis' Abbey, who is often said to have been born in Saint-Hippolyte. He also obtained from Pope Stephen II the relics of Saint Hippolytus, after whom the new priory was named, and in due course also the village.

St. Hippolyte's was at first a cell of Lièpvre Priory, founded by Fulrad at the same time, but soon became a priory dependent on the abbey of Saint-Denis.
