= Taennchel =

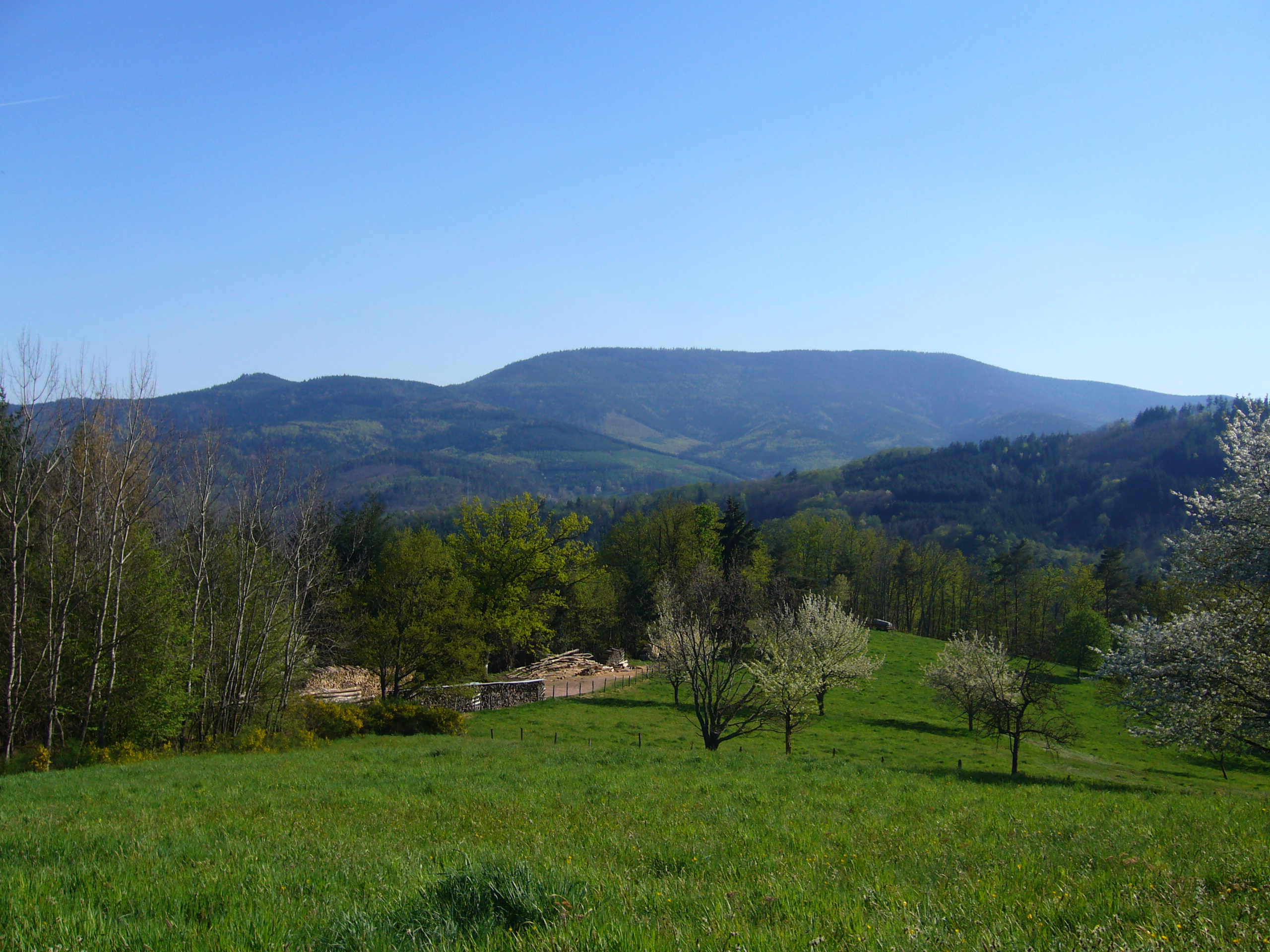
- Taennchel from Rombach-le-Franc

Highest point
- Elevation: 988 m (3,241 ft)
- Coordinates: 48°14′05″N 7°15′32″E

Geography
- Location within France
- Location: Haut-Rhin, France
- Parent range: Vosges Mountains

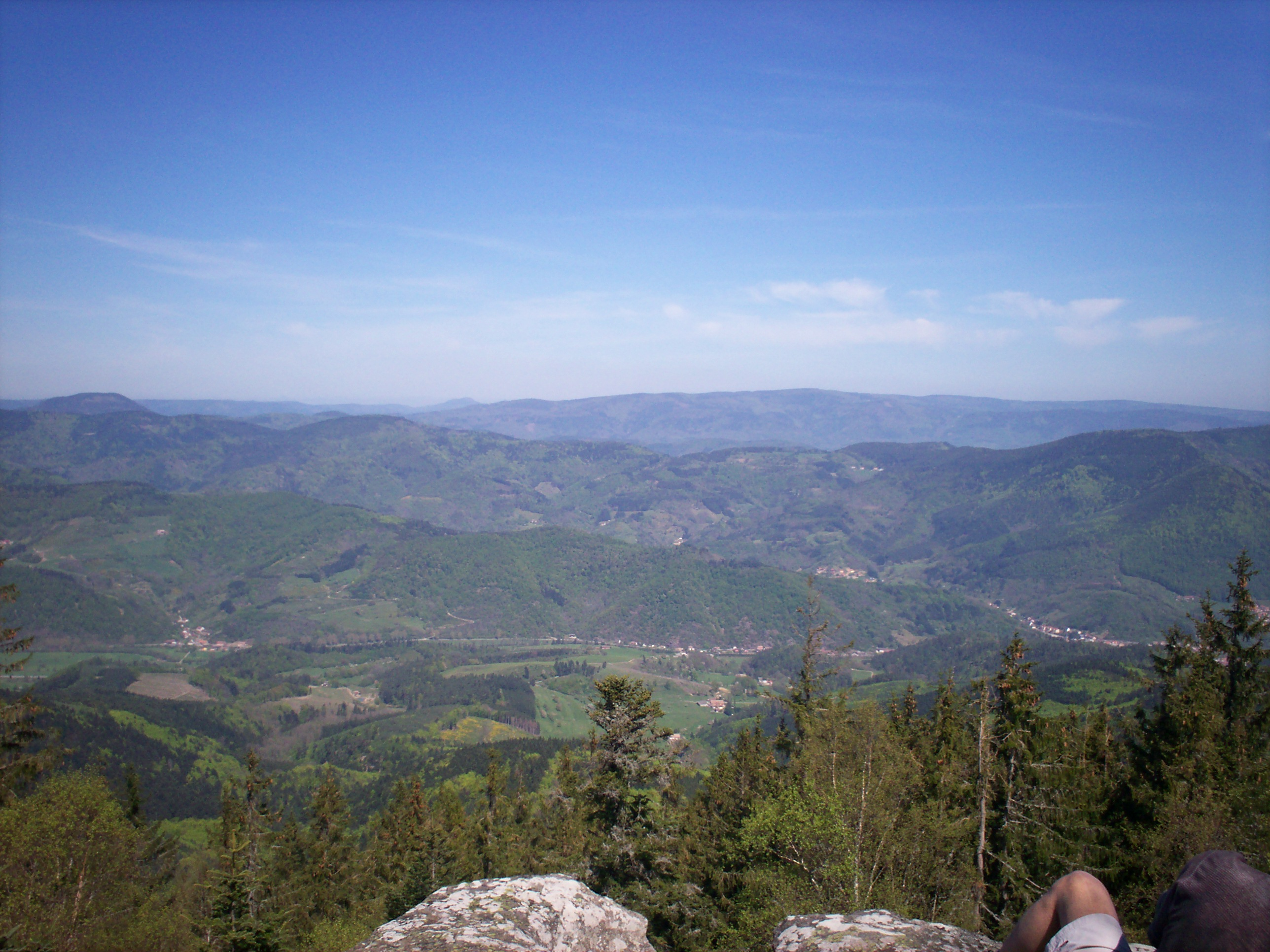
View of Lièpvre, the entry of Rombach-le-Franc, and Musloch from the Rock of the Reptile at the Taennchel

The Taennchel is one of the summits of the Vosges Mountains, rising to 988 metres (3,241 ft). It is located in eastern France, in the department of Haut-Rhin (Alsace region), roughly halfway between Strasbourg to the north and Mulhouse to the south, about 60 km (40 mi) from both cities.

The general area around the crest, which is 6 km long, is enigmatic. The ground is strewn with rocks and various inscriptions, many of them undeciphered and still mysterious. Another curiosity is the "pagan wall" that covers its sides and whose origin is unknown.

The summit shelters numerous plant and animal species, including the lynx, which was reintroduced to the area during the 20th century.

== Geography ==
=== Location ===
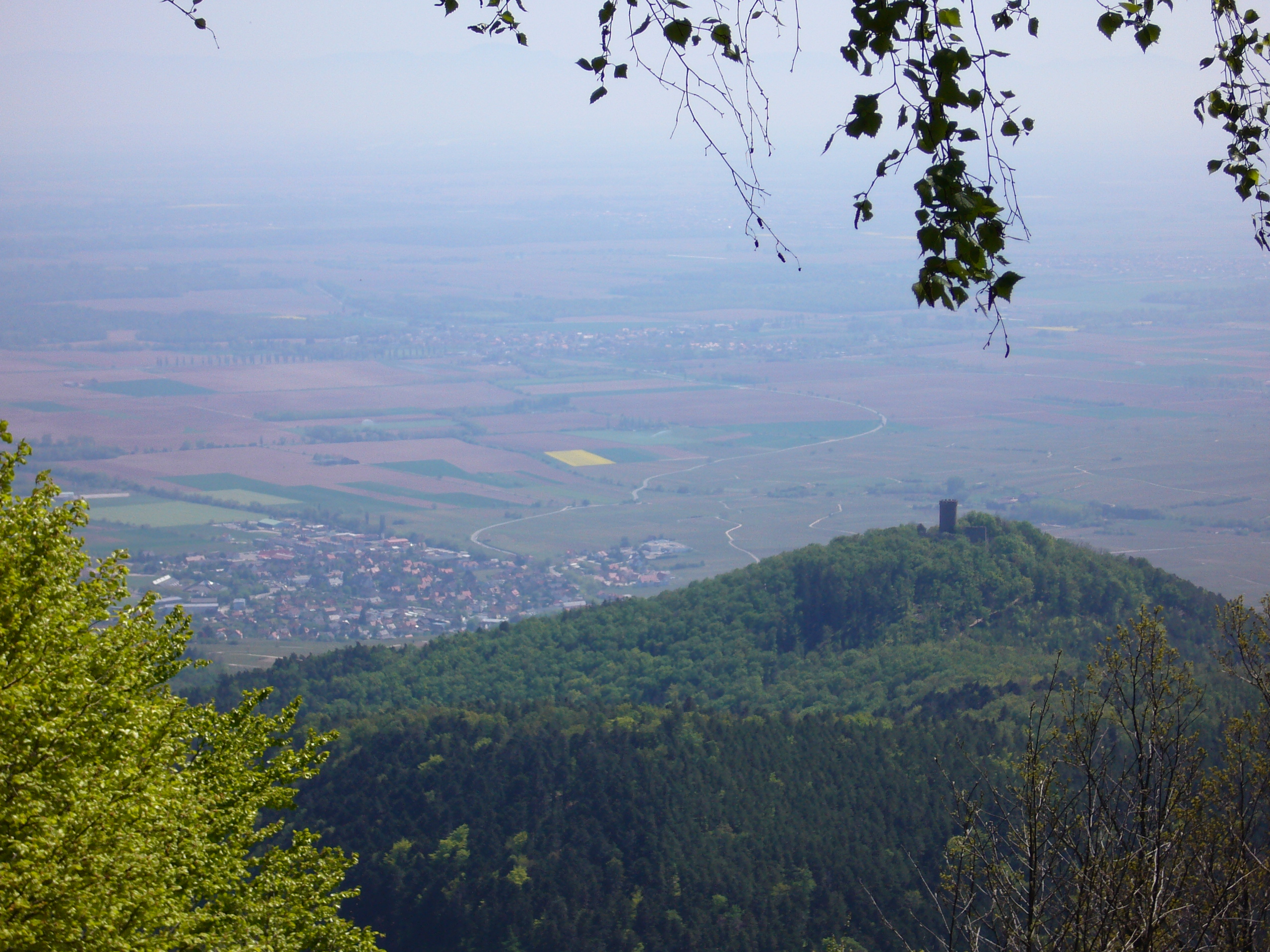
View of the Haut-Ribeaupierre castle (642 m high) and the village of Ribeauvillé from the rock of the Peace of Udine, 902 m high

The peak of the mountain, situated opposite the Haut-Koenigsbourg, in the massif des Vosges, separates the valley of Ribeauvillé from the Val de Lièpvre over an area of about 800 hectares. To the north-east of the Taennchel lies the village of Thannenkirch, and to the south on can reach the old glassworks of the Ribeaupierre which overlook the rocky blocks of the Mittelberg (about 600 m), the Venuskopf and the Schelmenkopf (905 m). The Taennchel is one of the summits that, from west to east, form the continental divide between the basin of the Liepvrette to the north and that of the Strengbach to the south. It's a large mountain, it's sides open widely and slope on the Liepvrette valley side, while on the opposite side, towards Ribeauvillé, it drops steeply into a grand cirque around the small twin valleys of the Grande and Petite Verrerie. The Taennchel has the shape of a crescent extending on almost 4 km from the rock of the Rammelstein which is 988 m high to the mountain that overhangs the lower Taennchel, from which, the three ruined castles of the lords of Ribeaupierre can be seen : Haut-Ribeaupierre, Saint-Ulrich and Girsberg.

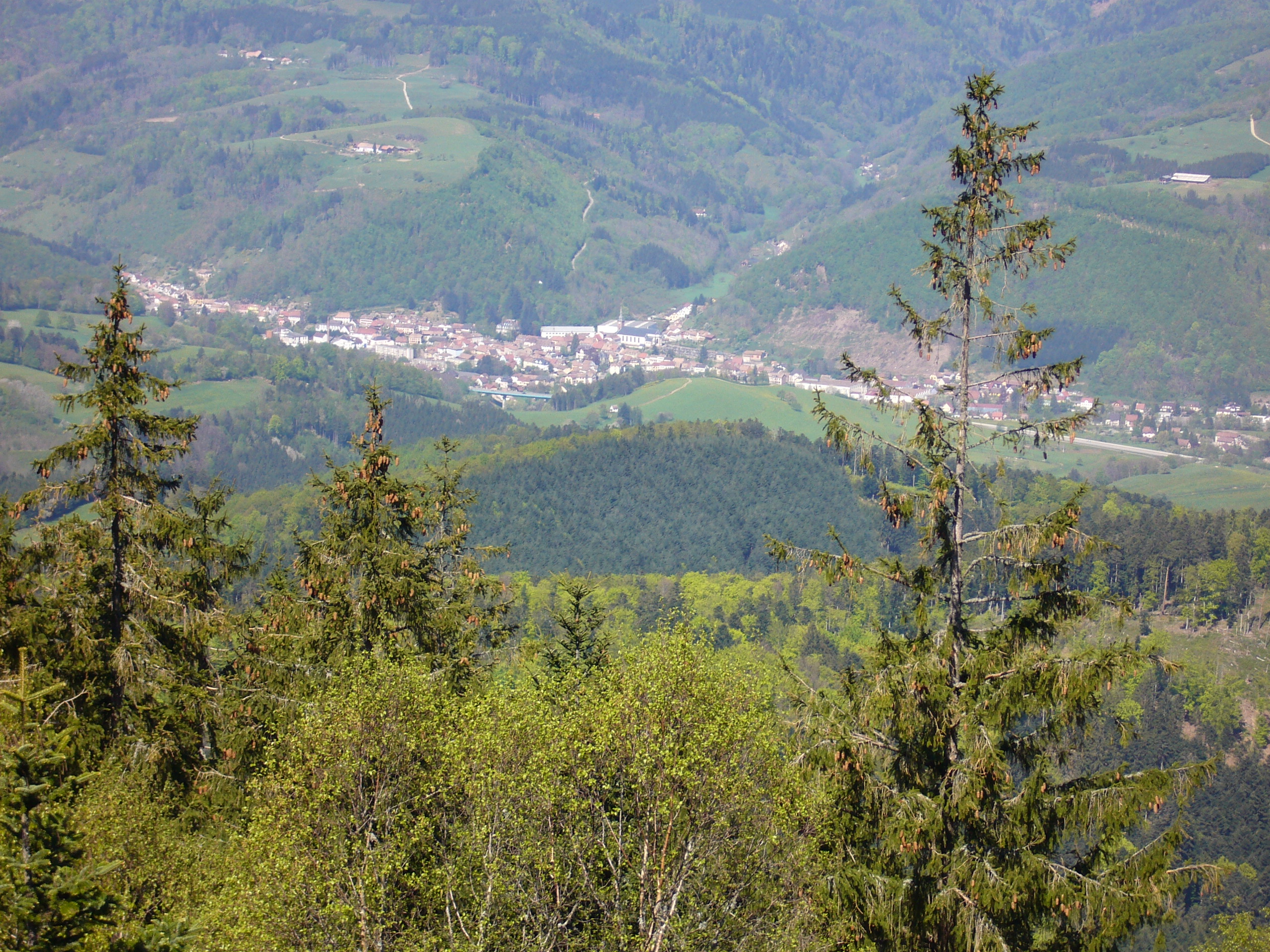
View of the village of Sainte-Croix-aux-Mines from the Taennchel

To the north-west lies the forest area of the Hury (named in old documents Jefurthe) which belongs to Sainte-Croix-aux-Mines. The forests of the Hury, Hinterwald and Kaelblin formed part of the holdings of the priory of Lièpvre until the High Middle Age as shown by the charter of Charlemagne signed in 774. The Hinterwald and the Kaelblin were later taken over the Alsatian neighbours following a change landlords in those villages, given rise to frequent frictions between the monks of the Abbey of Saint-Denis' abbey the Alsatian towns. These disputes poisoned relations between Alsace, the Abbey of Saint-Denis' and the Duchy of Lorraine until 1718.

Near the North-East point rises the Rock of Crows which dominates a steep slope and reveals rocks with strange and impressive bends. A little farther stands the rock shelter with a shape like a cave. The Pointed Rock (or Sharp Rock) resembles a seated boar. Weather, winds and storms have errored its outer face side, exposing quartzite stones of various colours. Not far away stand cracked rocks, composed of huge blocks and a little further still the beginning of the pagan wall can be seen.

According to tradition this place was used for hunting, and the lords of Ribeaupierre enclosed and fed there stags and does there. However, it cannot have been intended for that purpose because its wall is not closed and could never have been built for that use.

=== Hydrology ===
Three springs on the south side of the massif supply the Ilbach and the stream of the Petite Verrerie, and an eastern spring feeds the Strengbach upstream of Ribeauvillé.

To the north of the number of tappped springs is greatest; they supply the Liepvrette.

== Geology ==
The Taennchel rests on a base of Precambrian gneiss. Its foundation is granite of the Upper Carboniferous (about 300 million years old) and is covered by a thick sheet Triassic sandstone (about 200 million years old) that drapes the mountain summits and flanks in horizontal layers.

== Etymology ==
Some say the name derives from the "Thannen" fir tree would have given its name to the massif of Taennchel; others derive it from Tan or Taen, which means oak bark.

According to the archaeologist Robert Forrer, who studied the Mont Sainte-Odile between 1898 and 1899 and published several works on the medieval period, "Taennchel" comes from the Gallic word dunon or dunom which means "fortified wall".

The name "Taennchel" was first recorded in an archival document of 1357. Its name subsequently appears under various spellings: Taennchel (1441), Thennichel (1473), Dannchel (1538), Tenchel (1416), Thaennchel, Tannchel, Dannichel, Taennchel, Tännel (1871) and Taennchel again from 1918 onwards.

== The famous rocks ==
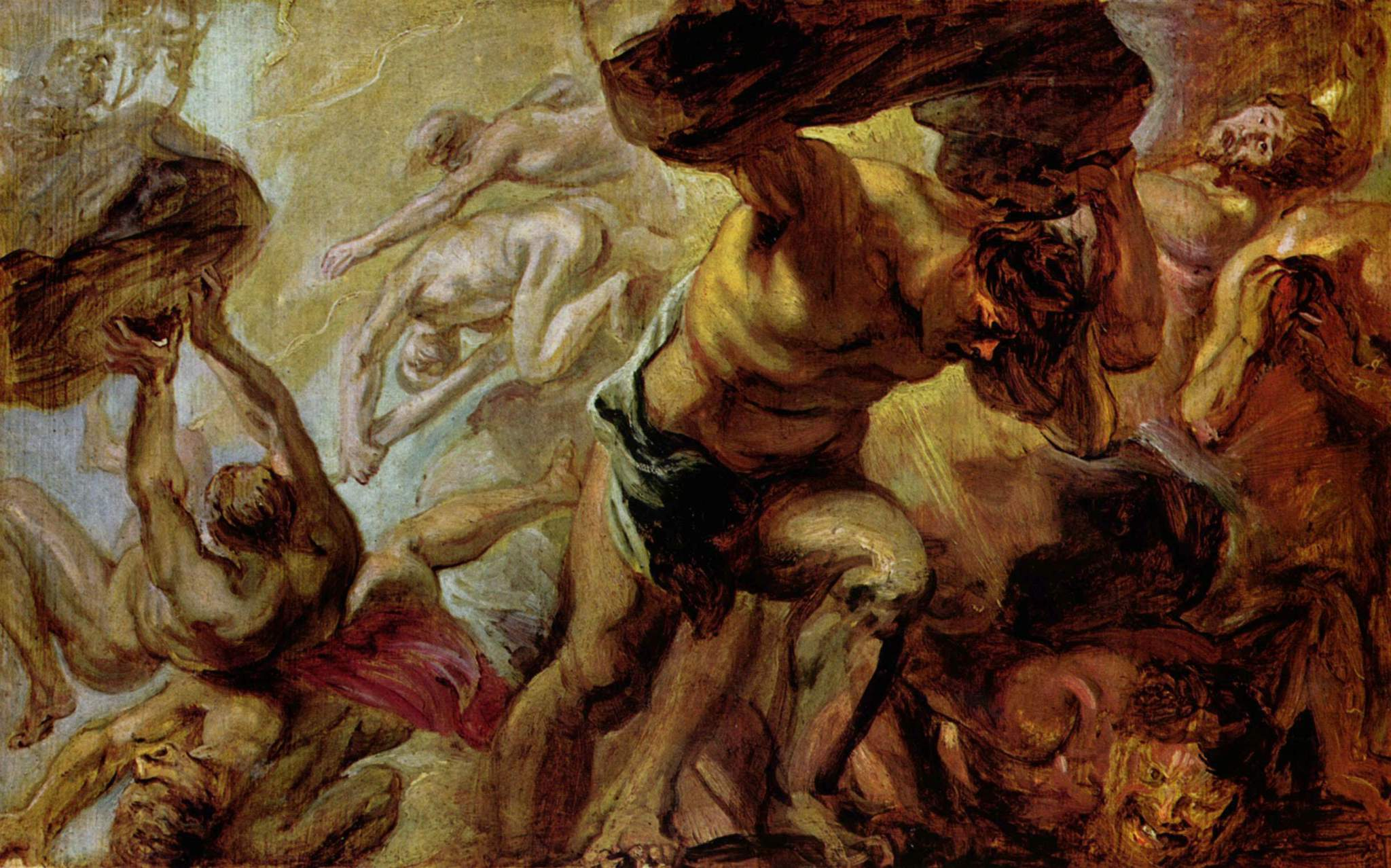
The Fall of Titans, by Rubens (v. 1637–1638)

== See also ==
=== Bibliography ===
- Armand Hampé, Du haut des sommets vosgiens, guide panoramique et géologique, Éditions Coprur, Strasbourg, 2001 ISBN 2-84208-088-2
- Guy Trendel, Le Taennchel, la montagne aux mystères, Éditions Coprur, 1994 ISBN 2-903297-77-0
- L.G Werner, Contribution à l'étude du Taennchel, Bulletin de la Société Industrielle de Mulhouse, 1927
- Fritz Kessler, Les murs dits païens de l'Alsace, Bulletin de la Société Industrielle de Mulhouse, 1913
- Adolphe Landspurg : Hauts-lieux d'énergie, Alsace - Vosges - Forêt-Noire, Éditions du Rhin, Strasbourg, 2000 ISBN 978-2-86339-083-2
- André Philippe Grandidier, Histoire ecclésiastique, militaire, civile et littéraire de la province Alsace, Argentorati, Lrenzii et Schulerii (Tome I) et Levrault (Tome II), 1787
- Christophe Carmona, Bernard Riebel, Marc Schultz, Haut-Koenigsbourg, Frankenbourg, Taennchel, triangle tellurique, I.D L'Édition, Rosheim, 2005, ISBN 2-915626-05-7
- Les 120 ans du Club vosgien, numéro spécial, 67 pages, N° 7, décembre 1992 (Cercle de Recherches Historiques de Ribeauvillé et environs)
- Félix Voulot, A.B.C. d'une Science nouvelle : Les Vosges avant l'histoire, Veuve Bader et Cie, Mulhouse, 1872
- Les bornes armoriées du ban de Ribeauvillé - Pierres remarquables et histoires insolites, Revue historique de Ribeauvillé et environs - Bulletin N°15 - Décembre 2006 - ISBN 2-35069-003-2
- (in German) Henri Kugler, Bann-un andere Grenzsteine in Ribeauvillé, Bulletin N°20, Société d'histoire et d'archéologie de Ribeauvillé, année 1957.
- Jean-Paul Patris, La vallée de Sainte Marie-aux-Mines : l'étrange et le merveilleux - Éditions Oberlin, Strasbourg, 1990

=== Press review ===
- Claude Jouve : Note du Naturel Elsass, octobre 1991, Éd. Alsacienne du Guide, Bulletin 143, Sélestat
- André Lemblé : À la découverte du Massif du Tennchel - Les Vosges, organe du Club vosgien n°3, 1999, p. 8-9
- L'Alsace du 30 - Taennchel : les archéologues enthousiastes (Édition de la Moyenne Alsace)
- L'Alsace du 3 - Archéologies allemands et autrichiens au Taennchel
- L'Alsace du 19 - Les mystères du Taennchel (article signé Lucien Naegelen)
- L'Alsace du 15 - Taennchel : messieurs les archéologues ...
- L'Alsace du 9 - Nature : un lynx dans le viseur et sur la crête de la vallée (article signé Georges Jung)
- (in German) Lucien Naegelen, W. Knaus : Magazine 2000plus, N°199 - Der Zauber von Tennchel, p. 72-74
- (in German) J.P. Dillenseger : Der Taennchel die Unberkannnte Stätte der Götter - Freudeskreis Geomantie, janvier 2000
- Charles Albert Spindler : Le Taennchel sauvage, p. 5-8, Les Vosges N°4, 1996, organe du Club vosgien
- Jean Daniel Kientz : Magique Taennchel - Saisons d'Alsace N°32, septembre 2006
