= Lièpvre =

Commune in Grand Est, France

- Commune
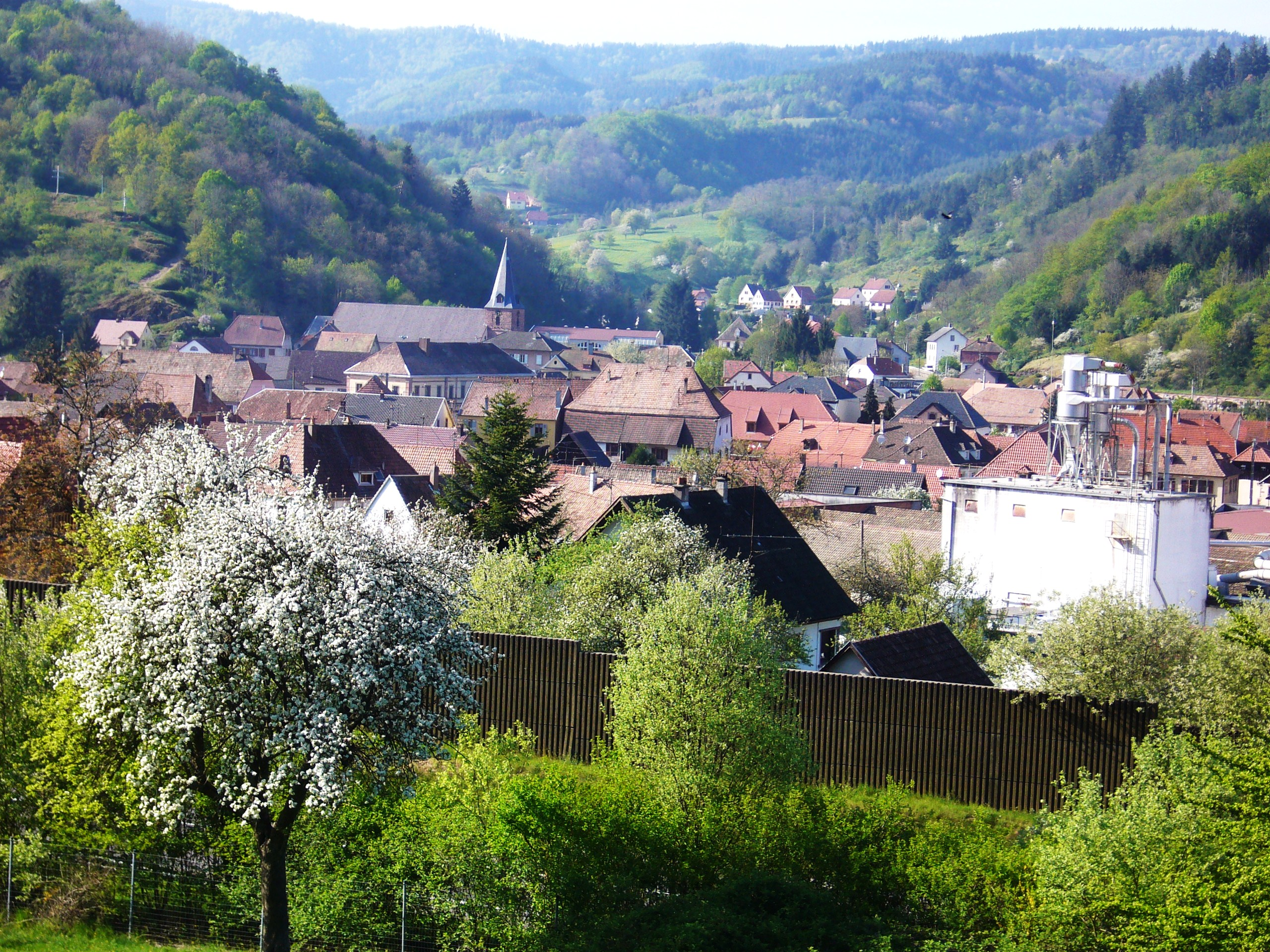
- Lièpvre seen from Hoimbach

- Coat of arms
- Location of Lièpvre
- Location within France Location within Grand Est
- Coordinates: 48°16′23″N 7°16′59″E
- Country: France
- Region: Grand Est
- Department: Haut-Rhin
- Arrondissement: Colmar-Ribeauvillé
- Canton: Sainte-Marie-aux-Mines
- Intercommunality: Val d'Argent

Government
  - Mayor (2020–2026): Denis Petit
- Area^{1}: 12.55 km^{2} (4.85 sq mi)
- Elevation: 275 m (902 ft)
- Highest elevation: 930 m (3,050 ft)
- Lowest elevation: 234 m (768 ft)
- Population (2023): 1,632
  - Density: 130.0/km^{2} (336.8/sq mi)
- Time zone: UTC+01:00 (CET)
  - Summer (DST): UTC+02:00 (CEST)
- INSEE/Postal code: 68185 /68660
- ^{1} French Land Register data, which excludes lakes, ponds, glaciers > 1 km^{2} (0.386 sq mi or 247 acres) and river estuaries.

Lièpvre (French pronunciation: [ljɛvʁ]; German: Leberau; Alemannic German: Laweröi, Lawerot) is a commune in the Haut-Rhin department in Grand Est in north-eastern France. A monastery was built here in the eighth century by Saint Fulrad, who filled it with relics of Saint Cucuphas and Saint Alexander.

== Geography ==
The municipality is nestled in the Liepvrette river valley as the river descends from the main chain of the Vosges into the Col des Bagenelles, a mountain pass in the Vosges. The Liepvrette runs northeast through Sainte-Marie-aux-Mines before reaching Lièpvre. Below Lièpvre, the river runs between the ruins of Frankenbourg castle in the north and the castle of Haut-Koenigsbourg in the south then across the municipality of Scherwiller. The Liepvrette then joins the river Giessen (Scheer in former times), which flows from the Val de Villé, before emptying into the river Ill near Sélestat.

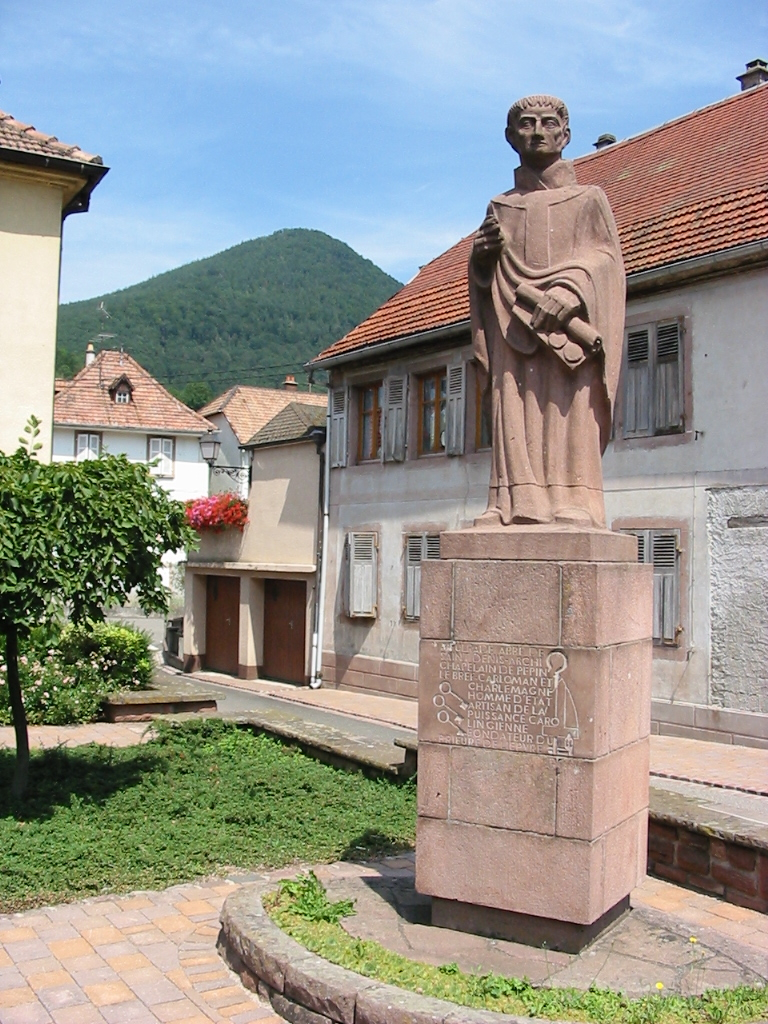
The statue of Fulrad at Lièpvre.

The municipality of Lièpvre is bordered by several summits in the Vosges: Brézouard (1229 m), Taennchel (992 m), and High-Koenigsbourg (775 m) to the south; Altenberg (880 m), Chalmont (697 m), Rocher du Coucou (819 m) and Frankenbourg (703 m) to the north. The Altenberg chain separates the Valley of Lièpvre from the Val de Villé. A road built in 1905 allowed access to Rombach-le-Franc, 2 km (1.2 mi) from Lièpvre. This road leads to the hamlet of Hingrie situated 7 km (4.3 mi) from Lièpvre and onto the Col de Fouchy. The village of Liepvre owes its name to the Liepvrette River and its origin to the priory of Lièpvre. Lièpvre is in the center of the valley and sits 275 meters above sea level.

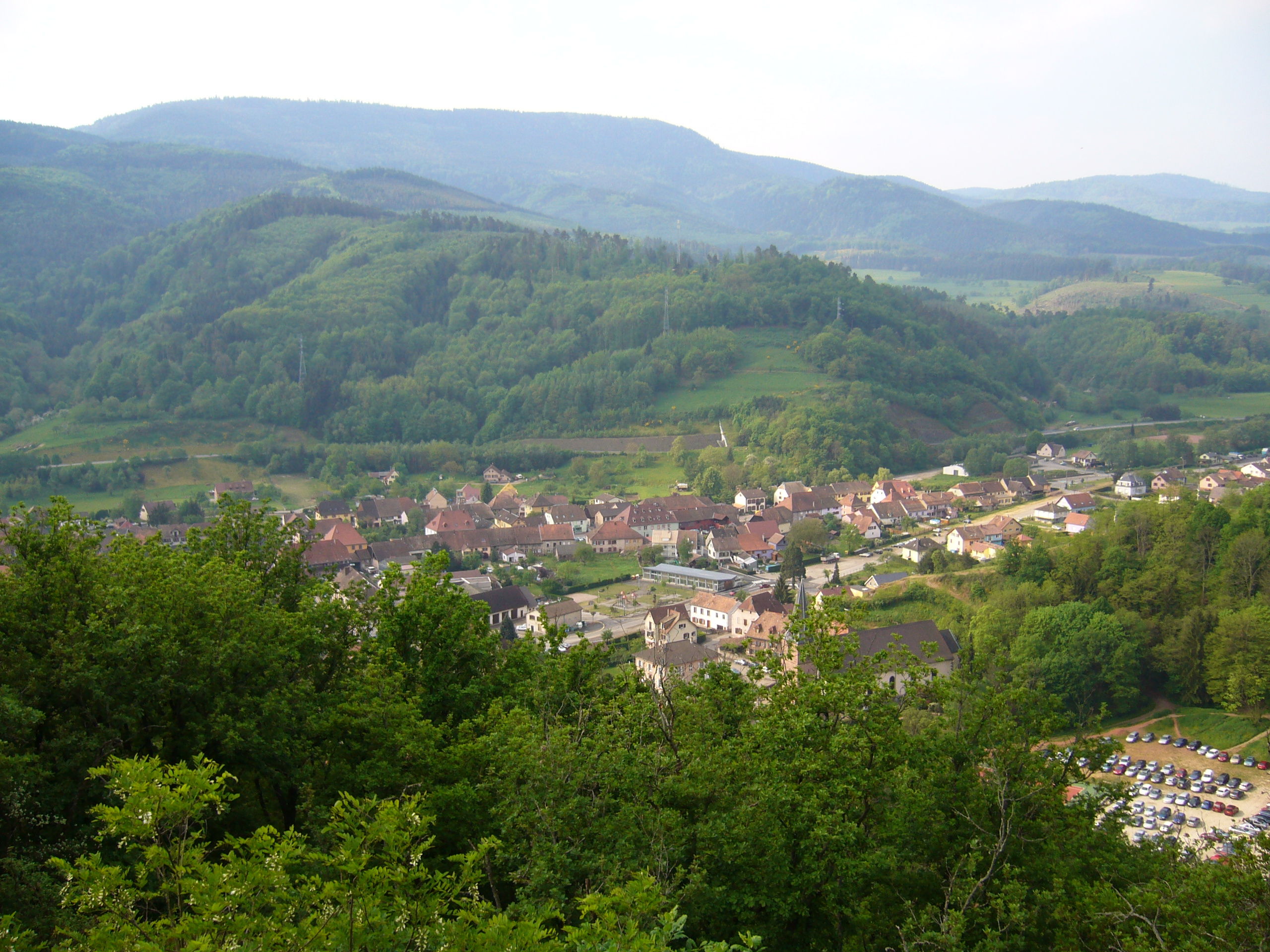
Lièpvre from le Kast

=== Municipal Boundaries ===
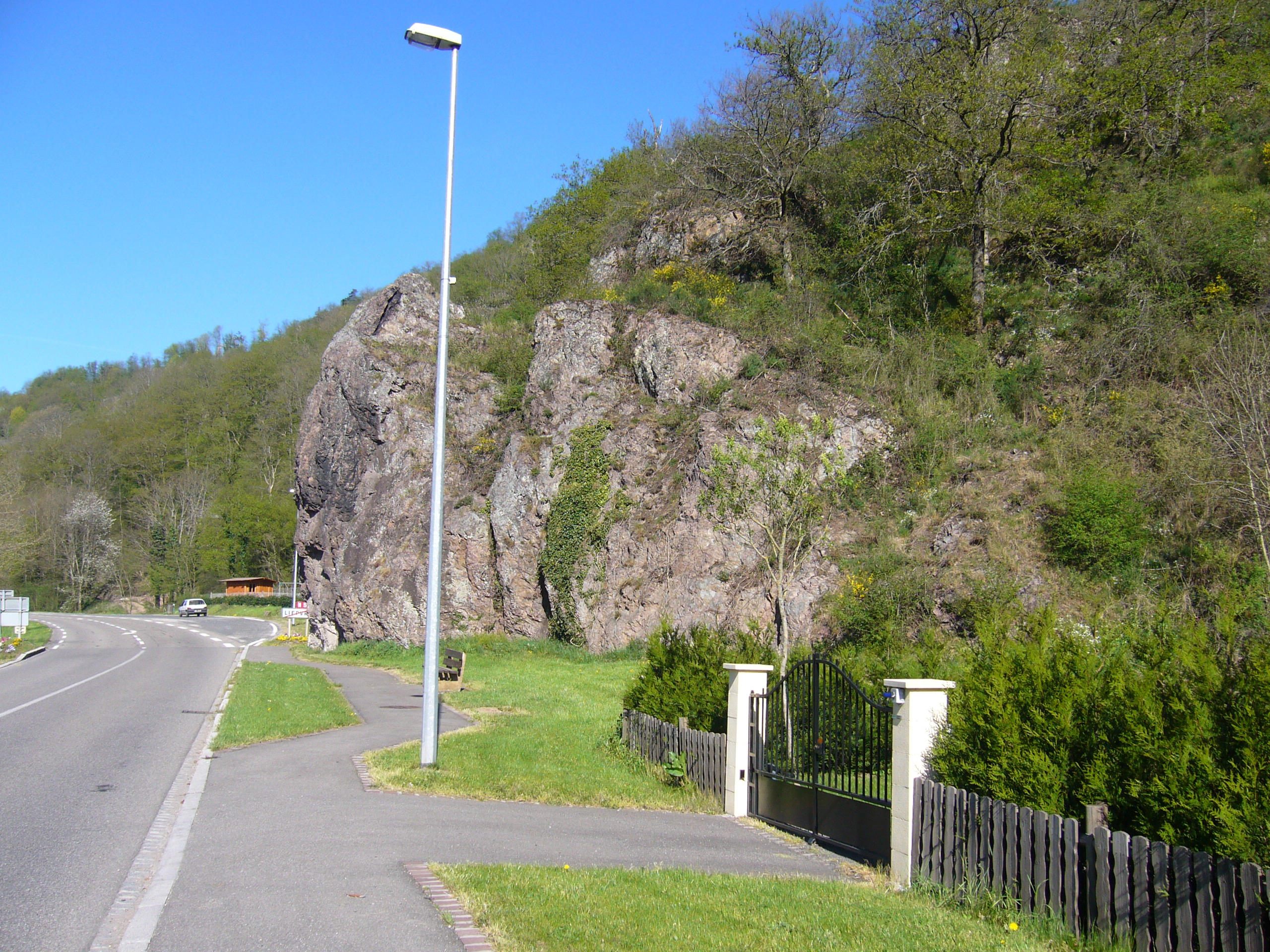
Rocher du Violons near Liepvre

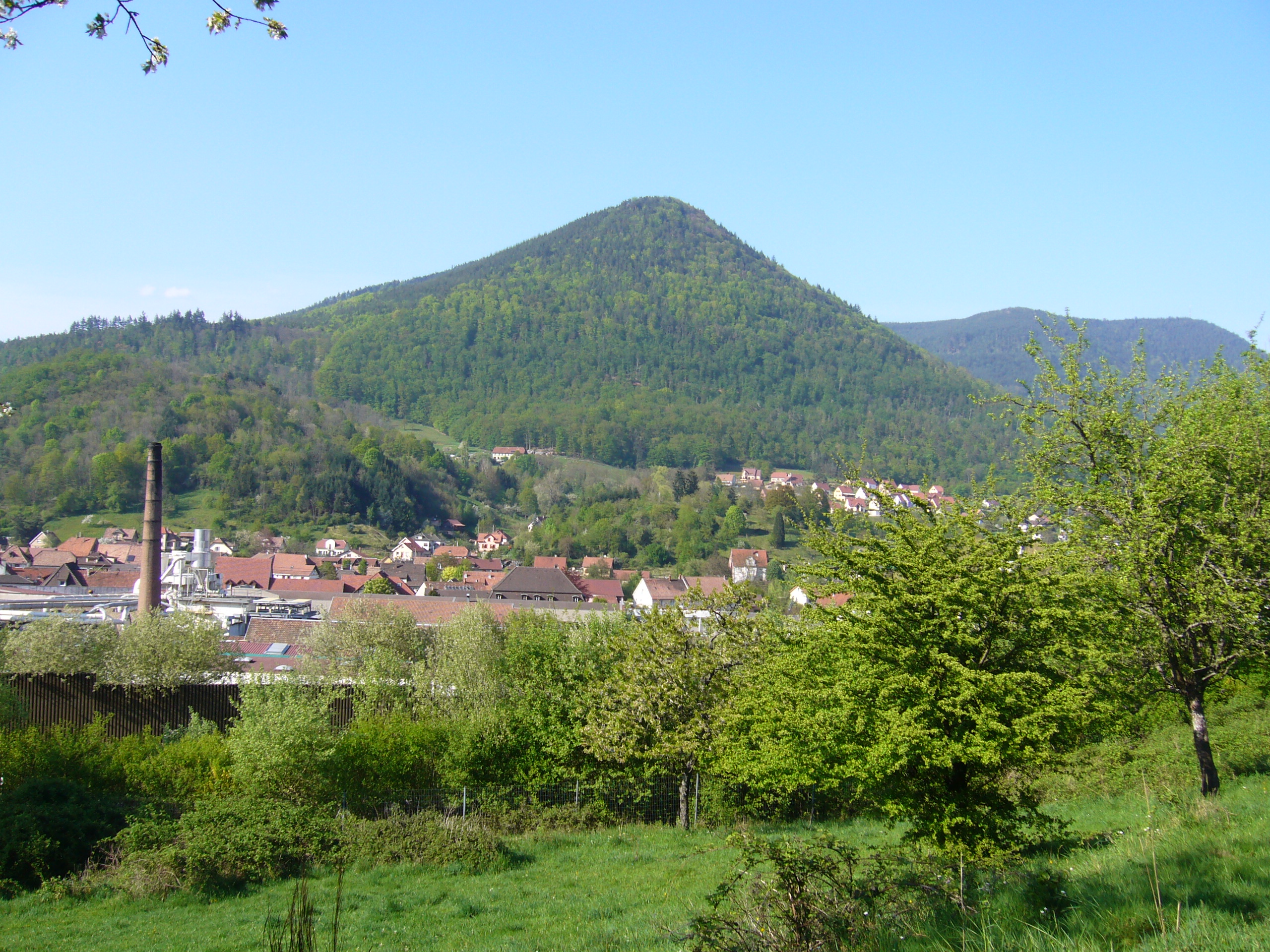
Chalmont seen from Hoimbach

In 1445 the hamlet of Musloch, between Lièpvre and Sainte-Croix-aux-Mines, was the refuge for farmers of the Valley of Lièpvre who surprised and defeated the Armagnacs near the Rocher des Violons after the Armagnacs invaded Lorraine. Musloch, named after a fifteenth-century mine, was called Museloch in 1517 and Mauslauch in 1782. A mine called St. Anne was opened there in 1545, but was abandoned in 1750 because the cost of exploitation was too high. Musloch was an established hamlet of about thirteen families by the time the mine closed.

== History ==
=== Hermitage ===
A monk named Bobolinus settled near Lièpvre where he built a hermitage named Bobolinocella by 774. This hermitage named for Bobolinocella is mentioned in a document from Charlemagne in 774.

A convent was also established in Echéry by a monk named Gorze Blidulphe during the tenth century. The monks were able to develop the priory due to the silver mines they discovered, which became celebrated in the region and in Lorraine.

=== Foundation of Lièpvre ===
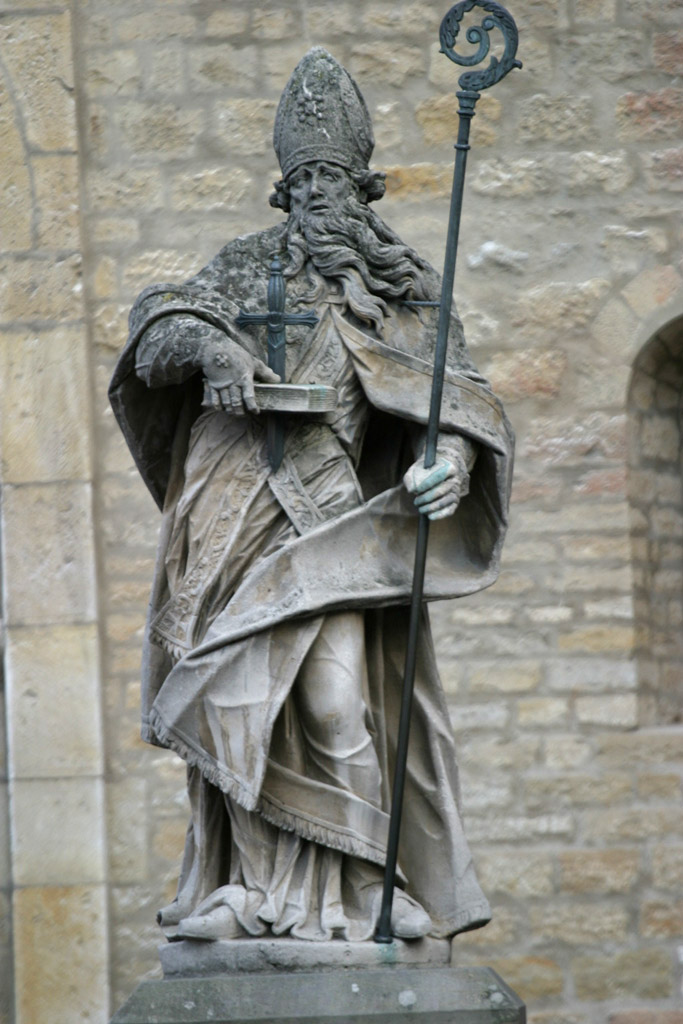
Boniface's statue of (Mainz)

Lièpvre (Leberau in German, Lebera or Lebraha in Latin) is a large village situated on the Lièpvrette. The village was founded by Fulrad, a future abbot of Saint-Denis, whose parents had extensive possessions in Alsace. People from opposite sides of the Rhine met with each other in the valley of Lièpvre. Fulrad was a Carolingian supporter and probably built a convent in this location as a way to access the other side of the border. Fulrad was also very close to benefactors of Wissembourg's abbey, which included Fulrad's brother, Boniface. Fulrad had two brothers, Gausbert and Boniface, and a sister named Waldrade. In 770 Fulrad began construction of a priory in Fulradocella, Lièpvre's primitive name. The priory was later named Leberaha.

The monks began to cultivate lands in the valley after the founding of the priory. In 774, Charlemagne approved Lièpvre's founding in a diploma sent from Duren and assures him at the same time of several other properties situated in the royal domain of Kintzheim's with good lands for farming and hunting.

The first road into the valley was constructed in 750 after Fulrad received a license to construct it from Pepin the Short. This road was constructed by serfs from the Saint-Dié (Saint Déodat's) region of the Valley of Galilée. This road passed through Lièpvre into the plain of Alsace. The road no longer exists today, and was replaced in 1761 by another road that passed through to Col de Sainte-Marie-aux-Mines.

=== Convent of Lièpvre ===
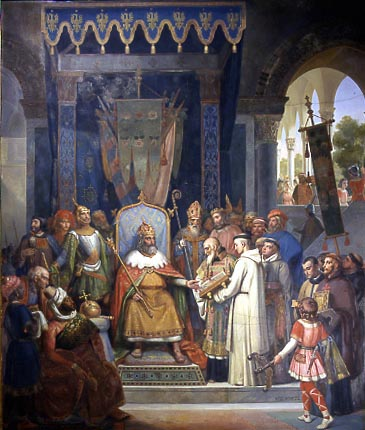
Charlemagne, surrounded by h

In 770 Fulrad began the construction of a priory named Fulraand docella (which later became Lièpvre). The construction of the priory took eight years, during which Lièpvre's village became developed. During the first year of his reign, on January 13, 769, Charlemagne donated Saint-Dié's convent to Fulrad. Roughly thirty kilometers of Lièpvre's territory was taken by the royal treasury of King Childéric II from the mayor Wulfoald. Wulfoald was accused of high treason and plotting against Pepin the Short. Wulfoald was condemned to death, but Fulrad's intervention spared his life. In return, Wulfoald gave King Childéric II his possessions, which included the Saint Mihiel abbey in the diocese of Verdun.

On September 14, 774, Charlemagne granted properties in the royal domain of Kintzheim to Fulrad. In 781 Charlemagne also granted a vast area of forests from Kintzheim to the abbey of Saint Denis, as well as the tithes of Lièpvre's nearby lands. He then named the convent for Saint Alexander and Saint Cucuphas. Saint Alexander's relics were first transported to Paris, then transferred to Lièpvre. In the year 835, the relics of Saint Alexander and Saint Cucufat were transferred to the abbey of Saint-Denis under Hilduin's abbacy. Cucuphas's relics were brought back from Spain between 777 and 778, when Sulaiman Ibn-Al Arabi governed the region of Barcelona. Sulaiman previously submitted to Pippin the Short between 756 and 753 to send Cucuphas's bones away from Spain to avoid the Moslems. The bones were given to Fulrad, who sent them to Lièpvre. The church was dedicated to Saint Cucuphas and continued until the fifteenth century.

In 750 Fulrad became abbot of Saint Denis and began alteration works on the abbey Merovingian. These works began after Pepin the Short's death in 771. On February 24 775, Fulrad dedicated the church reconstruction of Saint Denis to Charlemagne.

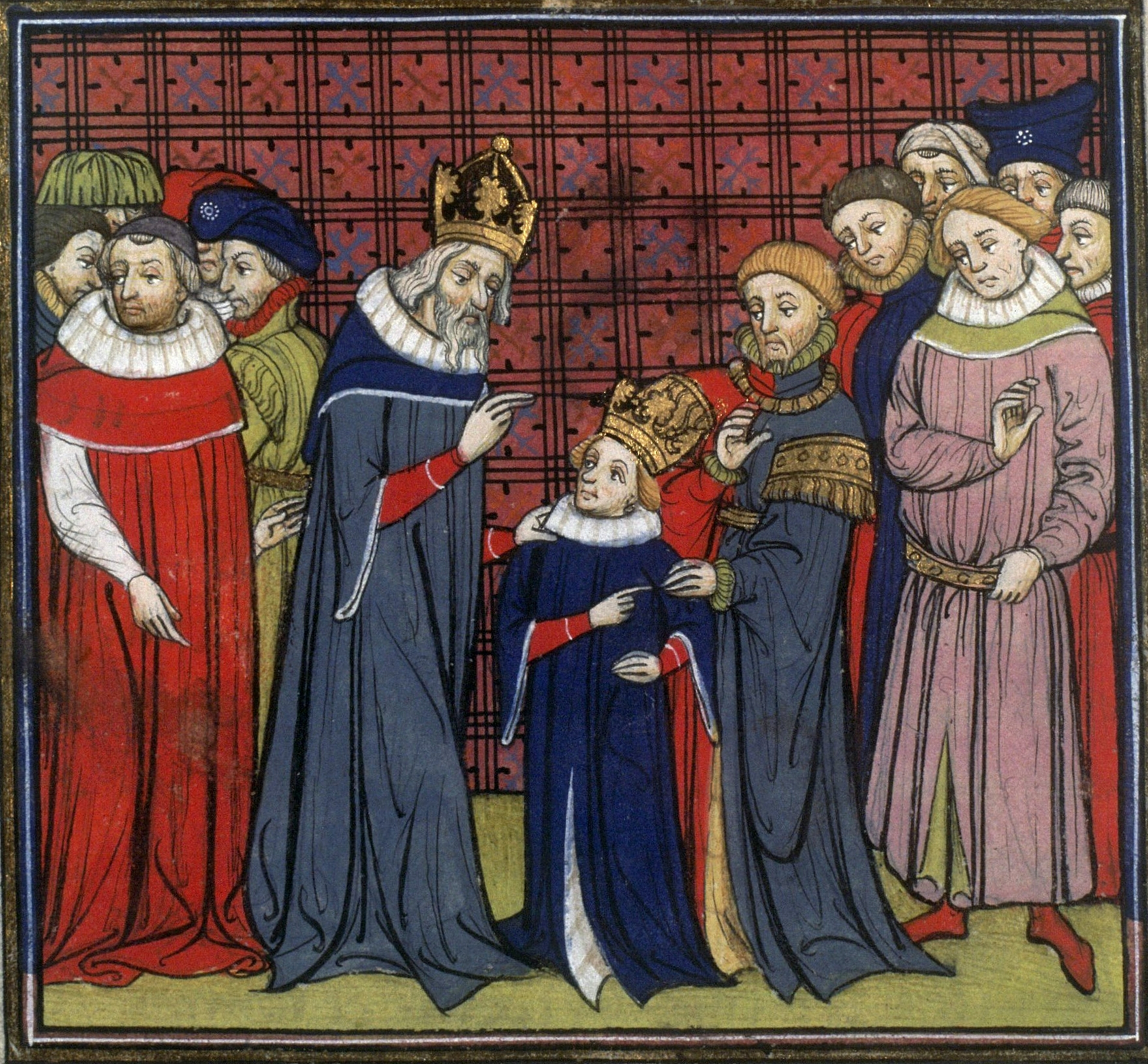
Charlemagne and his son Louis the Pious

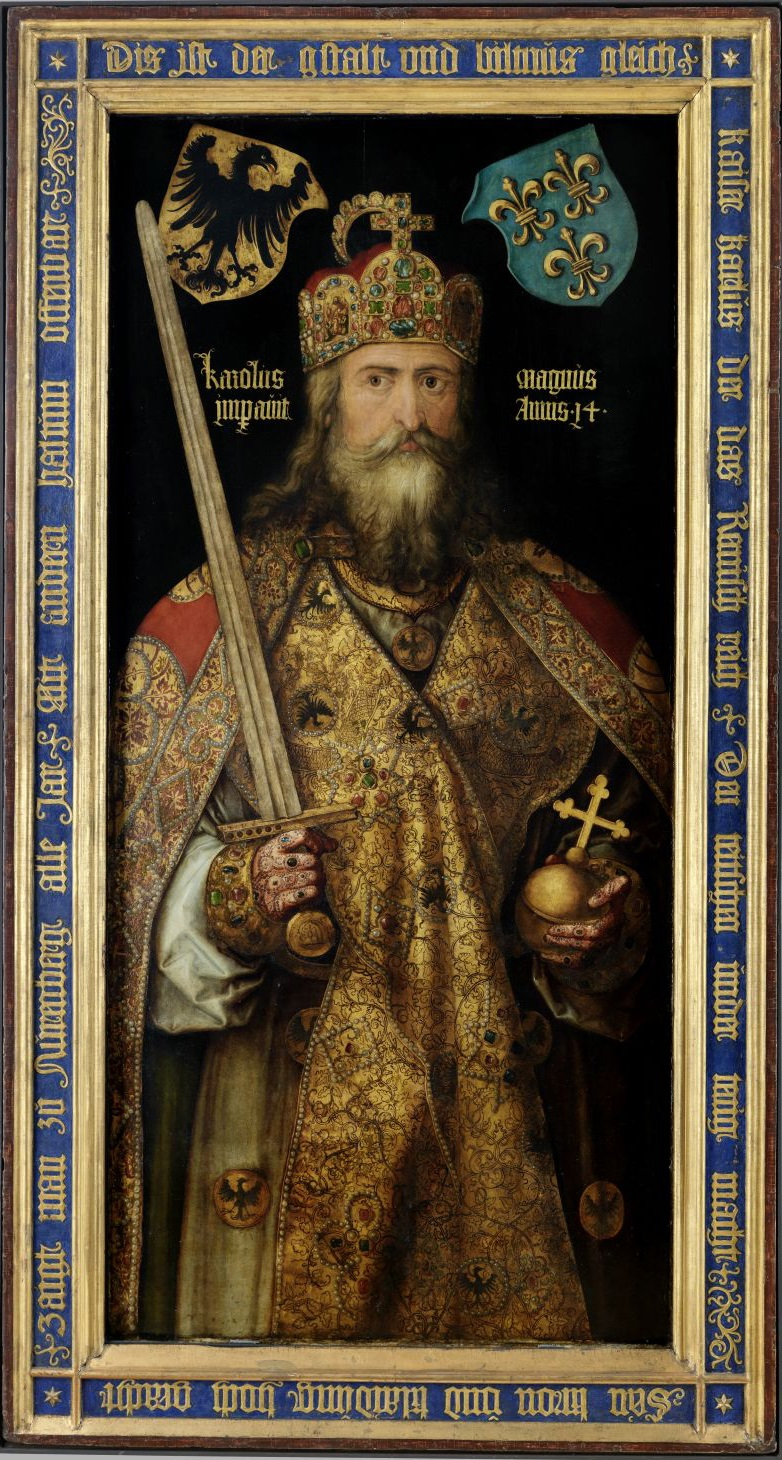
Charlemagne's portrait paints by Albrecht Dürer

Fulrad was based at other convents during the reconstruction, the most notable of which were Salonne near Castle Salt marshes (Moselle) and Saint Hippolyte near Lièpvre. He was also integral to the creation of Esslingen-am-Neckar's convent near Stuttgart in Baden-Württemberg.

On February 26 757, Pope Stephen II gave Fulrad permission to build convents on his own lands. Lièpvre's village was already prosperous by time of Fulrad's death. According to the former necrology of the Abbey of Saint Denis, the body of the abbot Fulrad was first interred at Saint Denis, then transferred to Lièpvre's priory. The donation of Fulrad's estate to the abbey was confirmed much later by Lothair I in a diploma sent by Verdun on August 4 854, which clarifies that the Abbey of Saint Denis owns all of Fulrad's former possessions.

=== Royal basilica of Saint Denis ===
Fulrad's will, drafted in 777, devised all of his possessions to the Abbey of Saint-Denis, where he was the abbot from 750 to 784. This will was intended as a precaution to ensure that these possessions would not be scattered by rivalries after Fulrad's death. This donation was endorsed in 768 by Pippin the Short. These possessions include a villa connecting Saint Alexander to Lièpvre, which Fulrad received from his sister Waldrade.

This will also mention possessions granted to Fulrad from Charlemagne in 774, including areas in Alsace, Garmaringa (Guémar), Odeldinga (near Orschwiller), and Ridmarca. Fulrad's will also mentioned the possessions received from Chrodradus on July 17, 767. Widensolen's church, in the district of Colmar, does not appear in Fulrad's will drafted in 777, but does appear in a copy which he executed a little later.

=== Fulrad's death ===
While Fulrad and Charlemagne were alive, Lièpvre was financially secure. In 843 Emperor Lothario Ier gave Quuningishaim (Kintzheim) to the count of Nordgau though this property had been given to Fulrad by Charlemagne in 774. The count also hoped also to take the forest, on which Lièpvre's priory depended.

Abbot Lewis, who obtained the abbey of Saint Denis in 841, attempted to remove the possessions of the priories of Lièpvre and Saint Hippolyte to grant them in fief after Fulrad's death. The monks of Saint Denis opposed this seizure and brought the issue before the assembly of bishops, whom reunited at the request of the king of France near Compiègne in 853. The monks produced Fulrad's original will and the bull of Pope Stephen II, which granted all of the property in question to the abbey of Saint-Denis. The council of Verberie, consisting of four archbishops and seventeen bishops, decided in favor of the monks and pronounced that Lièpvre's priers could never be alienated.

Abbot Lewis of Saint Denis was caught by the Normans and ransomed soon afterwards. A large ransom was paid by several churches, including the abbey of Saint Denis. After his liberation, Abbot Lewis declared that after his death all incomes of the abbeys of Saint Denis were to be used for the improvement of these churches as well as for feeding the poor in the churches' districts. Charles le Chauve, king of France, approved this disposal in a diploma signed in Compiègne in 856.

=== Disputed priory ===
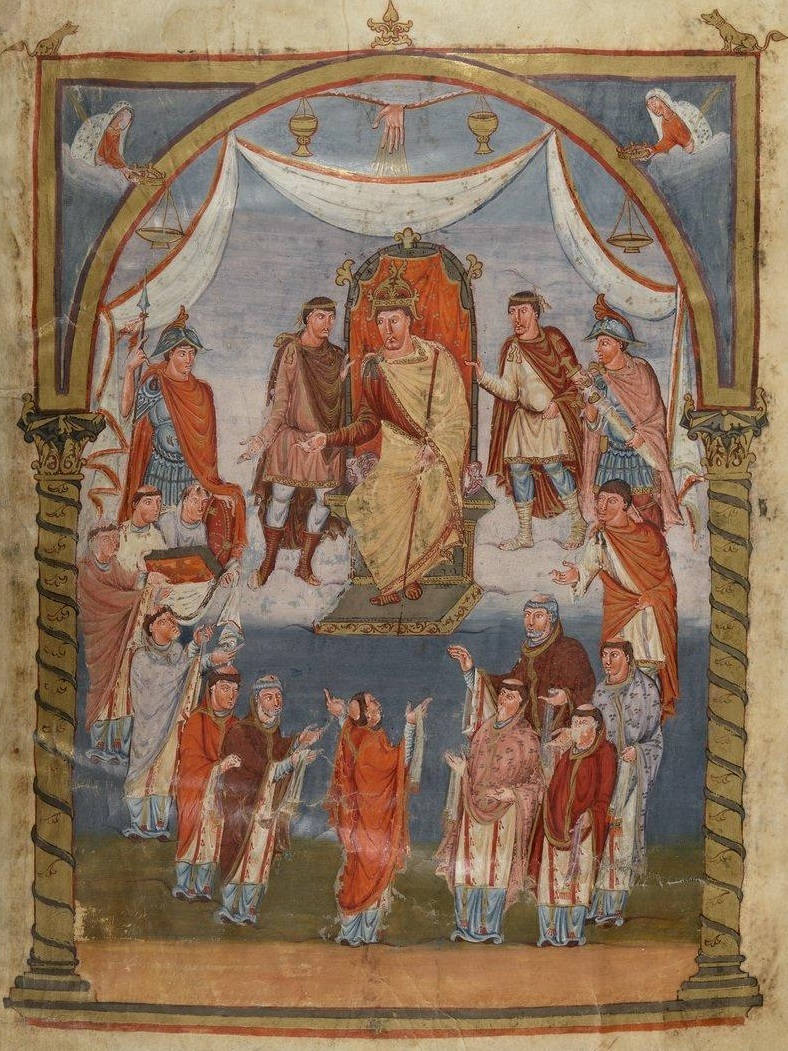
Charles II the Bald

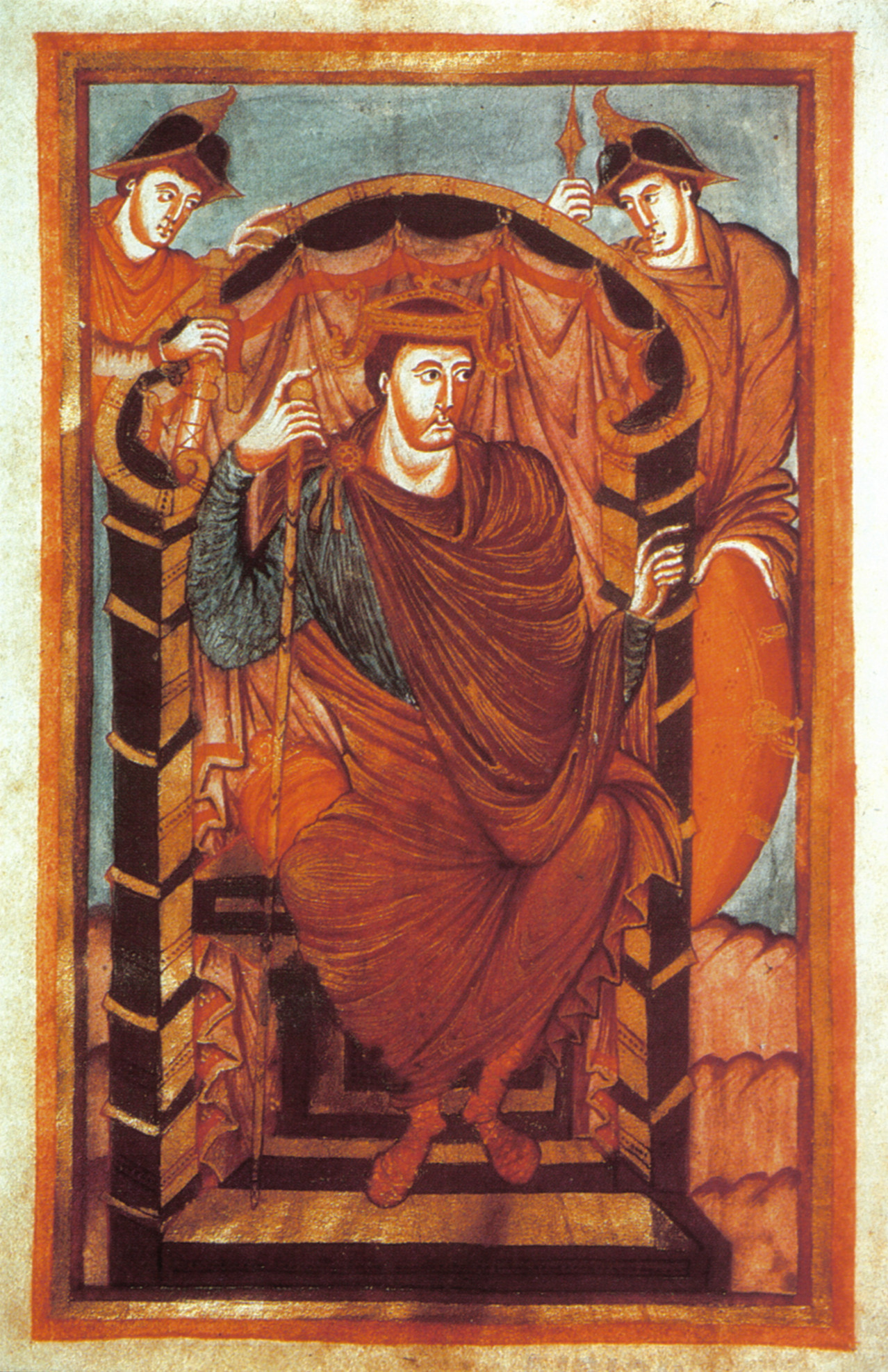
Lothair I

Charlemagne was the first to give his support for Lièpvre's priory in 774. In February 847 Charles the Bald confirmed the possessions and the privileges of Lièpvre's convent. In 856 Charles the Bald also confirmed the capacities of Abbot Louis. The Pope (858-867) confirmed Lièpvre's charter on April 18, 862. On June 12, 866, Lothair II, king of Lorraine, renewed the support the diploma that his father had given twelve years before in favor of Lièpvre's convent. Worms's treaty, made around 876, between the three brothers, Charles the Bald, Louis the German and Lothair I, determined that the possessions of Lièpvre's priory had to remain in the hands of the Abbey of Saint-Denis. Louis the Bald sent the diploma to Pope Léon IV to seal this alliance and to obtain his approval. On June 5, 903 Charles the Simple sent letters to assure the monks of Lièpvre that no attempts would be made to appropriate the property of Saint-Denis. After Charles the Simple was dethroned in 922, Henry I the Fowler, King of Germania, imposed his control on all Lotharingia (923–923).

On October 15, 980, Lièpvre was conquered by Louis IV. Otto II, King of Germania, declared Lièpvre's priory to be part of the abbey of Saint-Denis. At this point Lièpvre's convent and the surrounding valley were part of Alsace. The convent and valley were passed to the Duchy of Lorraine when the Duke of Lorraine acquired the convent. Pope Nicholas II reiterated in a papal bull issued on April 18, 1061, that Lièpvre's convent was to remain part of Saint-Denis. Later popes also issued a similar bulls on December 18, 1156, and October 11, 1259, reiterating that the possessions of the priory must stay in the patrimony of Saint Denis. In 1342, 1348 and 1354 Lièpvre was also confirmed to have the benefits of the abbey of Saint Denis. Alexander IV also granted his support for the monks of Lièpvre in 1388. In 1396, Charles II declares himself the defender of Lièpvre's convent.

The monks of Lièpvre often lost possessions after frequent changes of sovereign power in Alsace because the monks could not adequately defend themselves. They appealed to defenders, and were first protected by the nobles of Echéry. Echéry was later conquered by Landvogt of Alsace and later passed to the dukes of Lorraine. By 1377 Hattstatt was charged as the defender of the Lièpvre valley. This defense was not effective enough to protect Lièpvre, because the monks of Saint Denis asked Charles VI of France to intervene with the Duke of Lorraine to restore Saint-Denis's possessions. The Abbey of Saint Denis had completely lost Valley of Lièpvre at the beginning of the fifteenth century was never able to recover these lost possessions. Hattstats swore to defend the priory and received half of the income from the Valley of Lièpvre in 1384. Hattstatt defended the Valley of Lièpvre until 1585. Documents dating from the fifteenth to eighteenth centuries indicated that Lièpvre's possessions appear to belong to Saint Denis, including properties acquired in Nancy, France in 1502.

=== Dukes of Lorraine ===
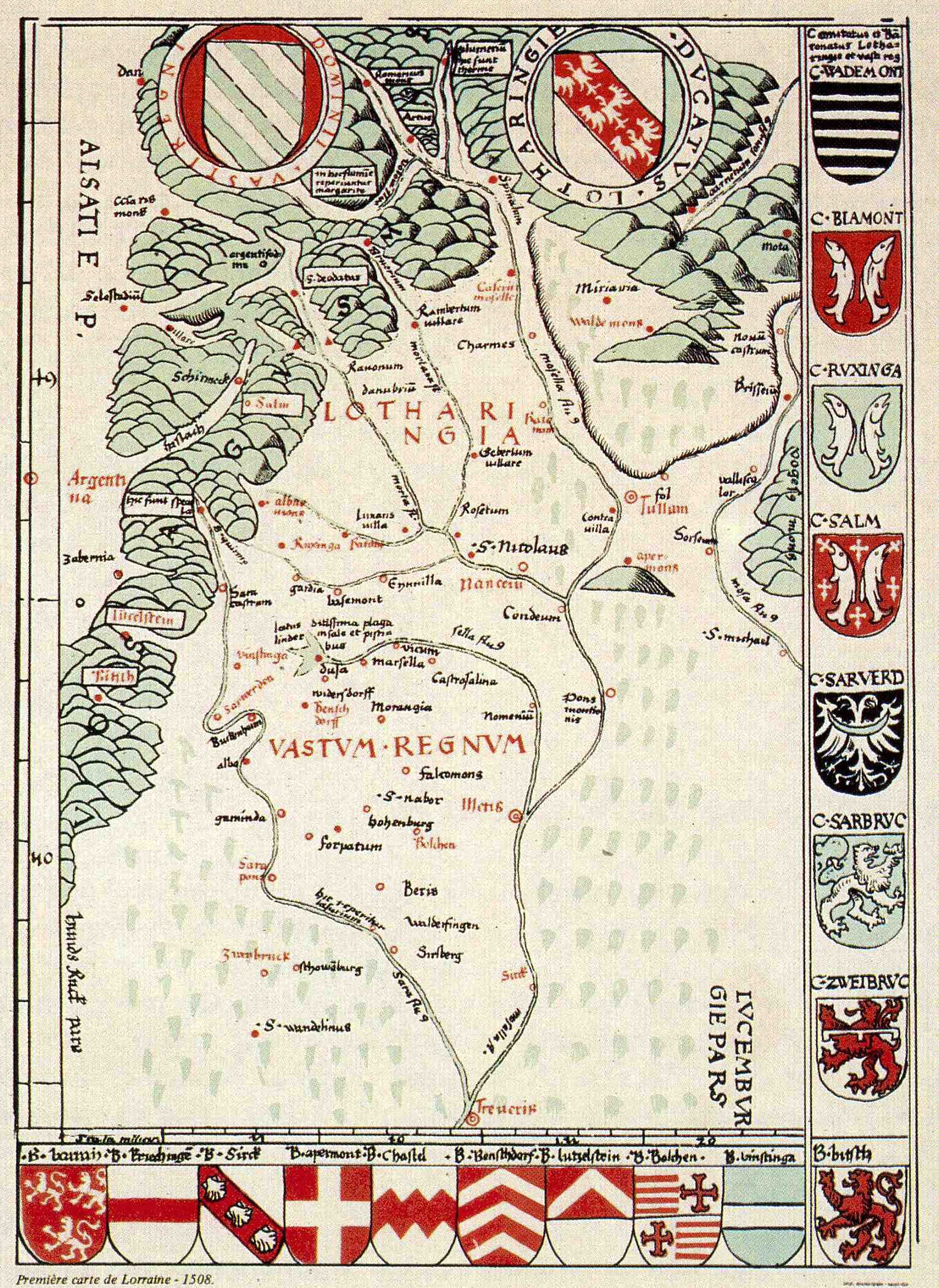
The first known map of Lorraine

Charlemagne charged the Dukes of Lorraine with the protection of Lièpvre in the eighth century. The Dukes of Lorraine were required to intervene militarily in every case of appropriation that could threaten the interests of the monks. While this intervention began as a benefit and courtesy to the monks, later the Dukes of Lorraine used this power as an excuse to interfere excessively in the business of the Valley of Lièpvre to the detriment of Lièpvre's priory. Dukes of Lorraine knew of the lead and iron mines run by the monks of Echéry since 963. The duchy of Lorraine placed a tithe on the mines by the time of Gerard, bishop of Toul, Duke of Lorraine from 1049 to 1070. In 1052 Henri III attempted to seize tithes from Lièpvre with the support of Leo IX, but the Duke of Lorraine defended the Abbey of Saint Denis. In 1078 Gerard's successor, Duke Thierry II, gave conquered possessions in Yves to Saint Denis.

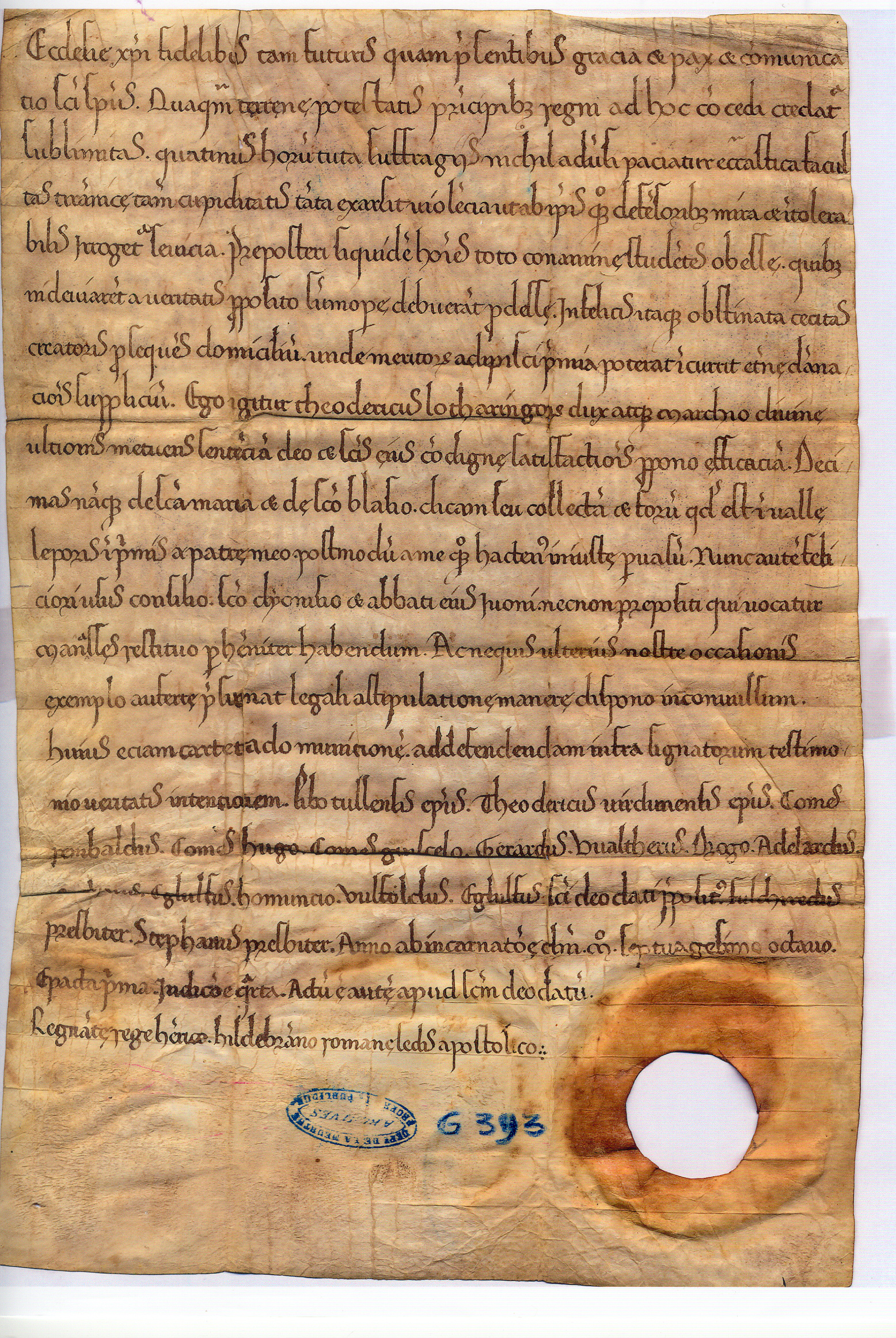
Restoration of tithes and markets by Thierry II duke of inhabitant of Lorraine, in 1078, in favour of Lièpvre's priory. - Archives of Meurthe-et-Moselle, Nancy, France G 393/1

Duke Charles of Lorraine seized all of the possessions of Lièpvre's priory in 1400, and these possessions were passed to the Pope by the bishop of Verdun in 1402. The monks of Saint-Denis sought restoration of these possessions in 1404 from Charles VI of France. In 1405 the monks approached the Duke of Lorraine seeking the return of this property. Charles VI of France eventually ordered two representatives to get the Duke's explanation on this seizure but the representatives never found the Duke. The church in Nancy, France gained the income from Lièpvre's priory, overseen by Warin, bishop of Verdun. Pope Pius VI confirmed that Our Lady of Nancy received the tithes of the Valley of Lièpvre, Saint Hippolyte, Sainte-Marie-aux-Mines, Lorraine, and Sainte-Croix-aux-Mines.

=== Decline and disappearance of the priory ===
The church of Lièpvre was built during Charlemagne's reign. The church was spacious and had a multi-colored marble floor. This marble tiled floor was removed in 1577 by Christophe de Bassompierre, the Master of Finances of Lorraine, and was transferred to Haroué's castle. The marble floor no longer exists today. Visitors to the priory in 1509 listed relics held by the priory: a reliquary with Saint Alexander's bones, eight other bronzed wooden reliquaries, gold-colored copper, and other ivory relics. The reliquary said to contain Saint Alexander's bones was broken by 1602. An inventory made in 1746 enumerates missals, chalices, pinafore dresses and the other ornaments, but does not mention any other relics, including the bones of Saint Alexander.

By 1229 Lièpvre's priory was burdened by large debts. Abbot Odon of Saint-Denis lent Lièpvre's priory 530 pounds, to be paid back from the annual income from the priory. The debt was nearly paid off by 1271 and owed Saint-Denis less than one hundred pound to be paid within five years. The priory of Lièpvre made a loan of eighty pounds in 1365 for the repair of a church that was ravaged by the English.

The most prominent building in Lièpvre was a basilica with a square bell tower, which existed throughout the seventeenth century. In 1652 the Mayor of Lièpvre became alarmed by the disrepair of the priory and ordered repairs to begin, particularly on the roof. The nave was damaged in 1666, leaving the choir as the only intact part of the church. Wars in the region throughout the seventeenth century damaged the church further. Repairs were attempted after 1738, but the priory remained in poor repair.

The ruins of Lièpvre's convent were demolished in 1751, and the material used for the construction of the Rombach-le-Franc's parochial church and Lièpvre's church. The former choir of the convent became a chapel until the French Revolution in 1789, and local residents bought the arable land belonging to the convent. The French government seized the forests and the chapel was sold and transformed into a house. During the Revolution, the Valley of Lièpvre was incorporated into the department of Haut-Rhin and no longer depended on Lorraine.

=== Current church ===
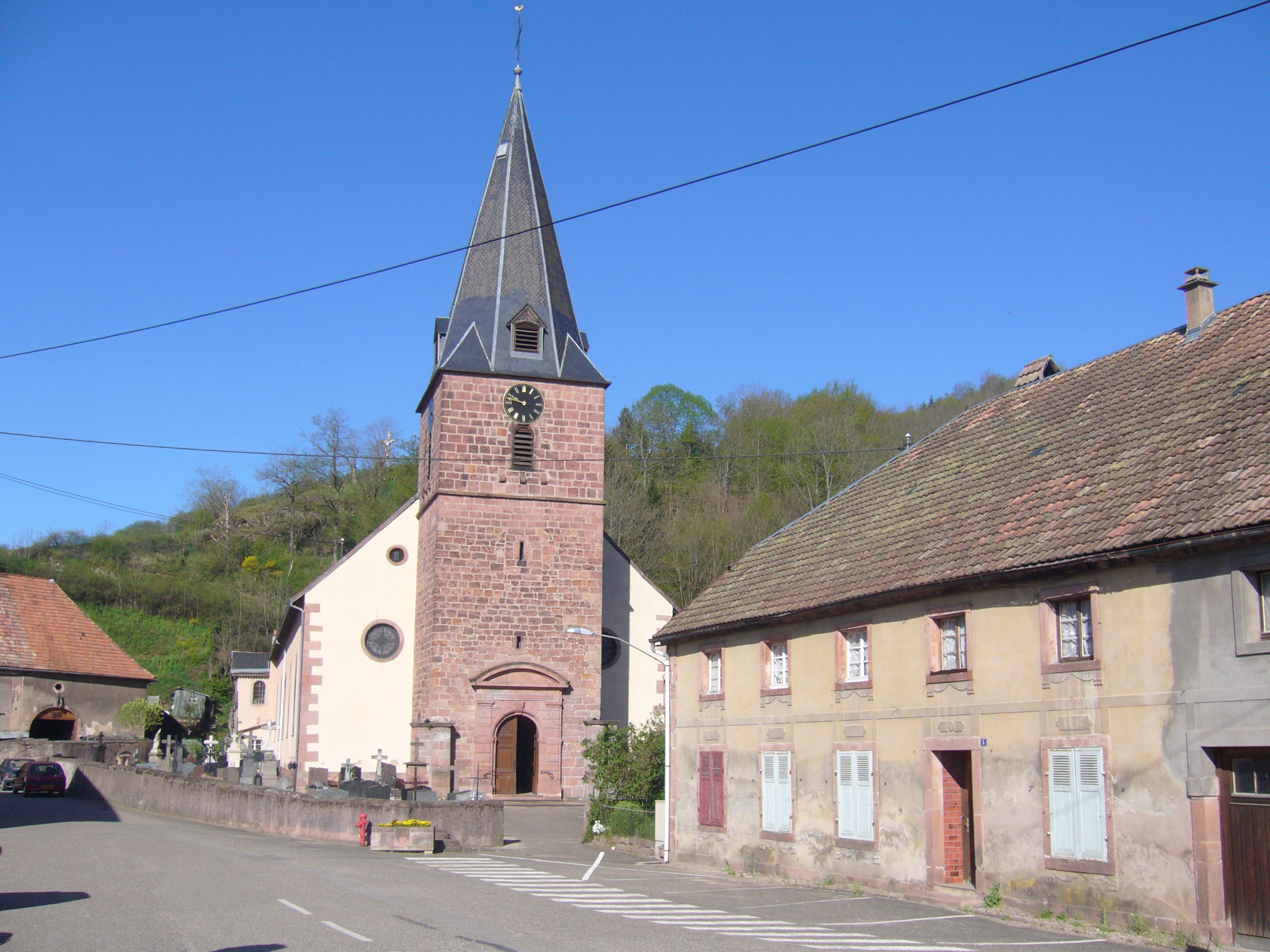
Church of Notre Dame de l'Assomption

Lièpvre's current church was constructed around 1752 on the grounds where the previous church stood. Gravestones and the altar from the previous chapel were placed in the new church in 1790, though the altar was changed in 1843. Originally these gravestones lined the walls of the church, but were later moved to the front of the church. The church also contains a baptistery that still remains under the bell tower of the church.

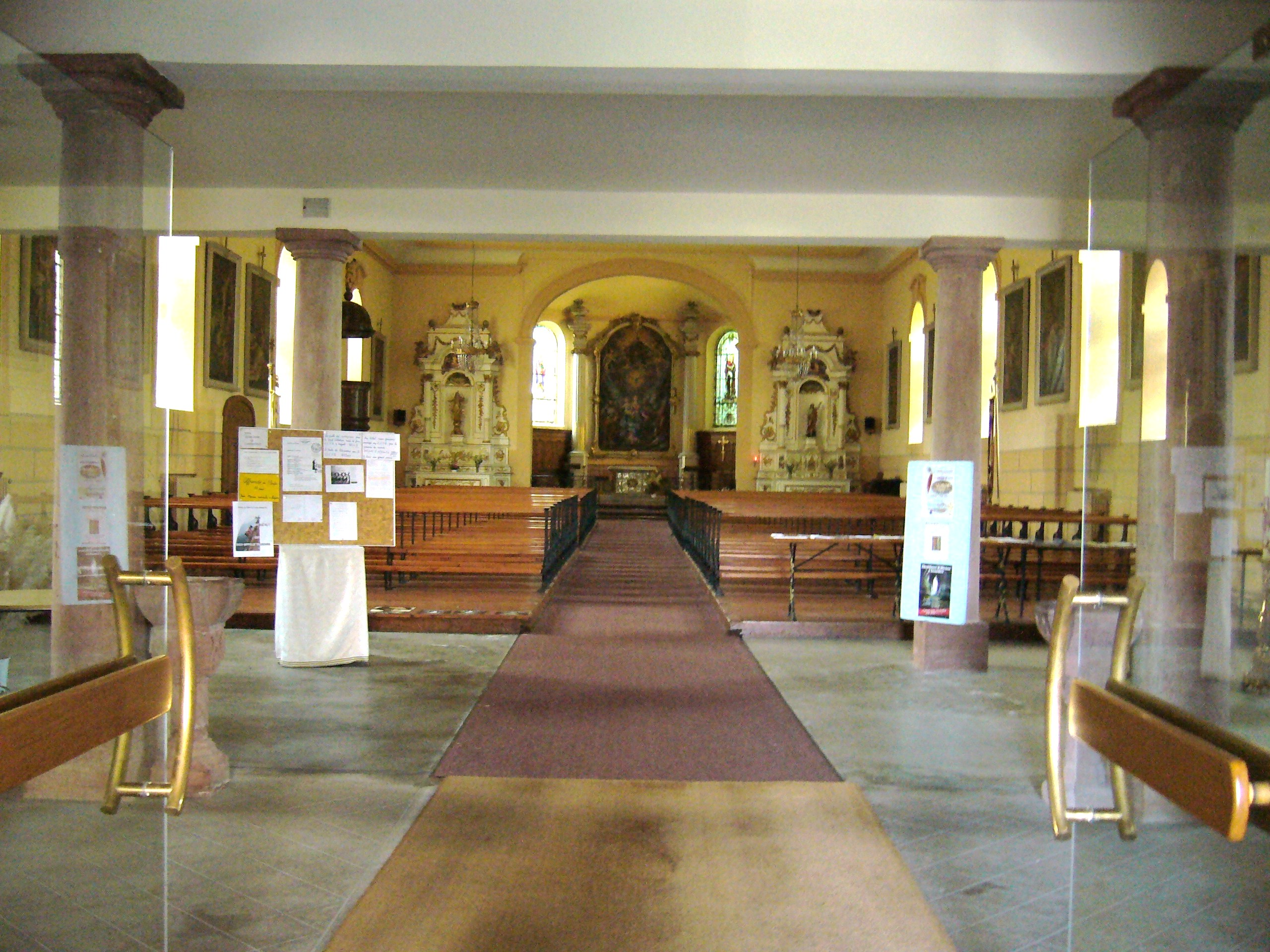
The inside of the church of Notre Dame de l'Assomption

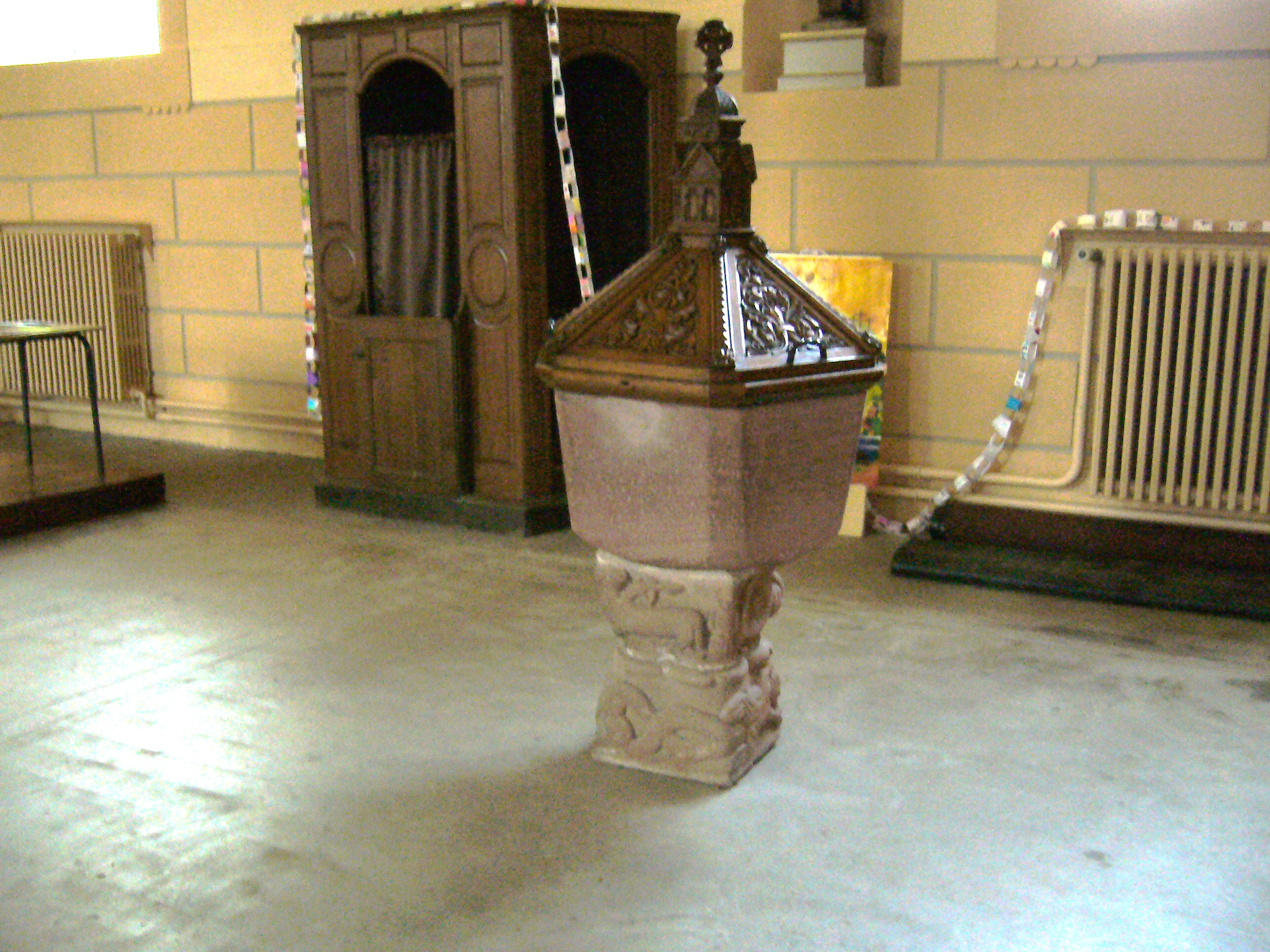
The baptistery exposed inside the church

The church bell originally came from the convent of Saint Alexander and dates from 1542. According to the popular legend she was hidden in a meadow near Lièpvre during the Thirty Years' War. The bell was dug up a century later and installed in the bell tower.

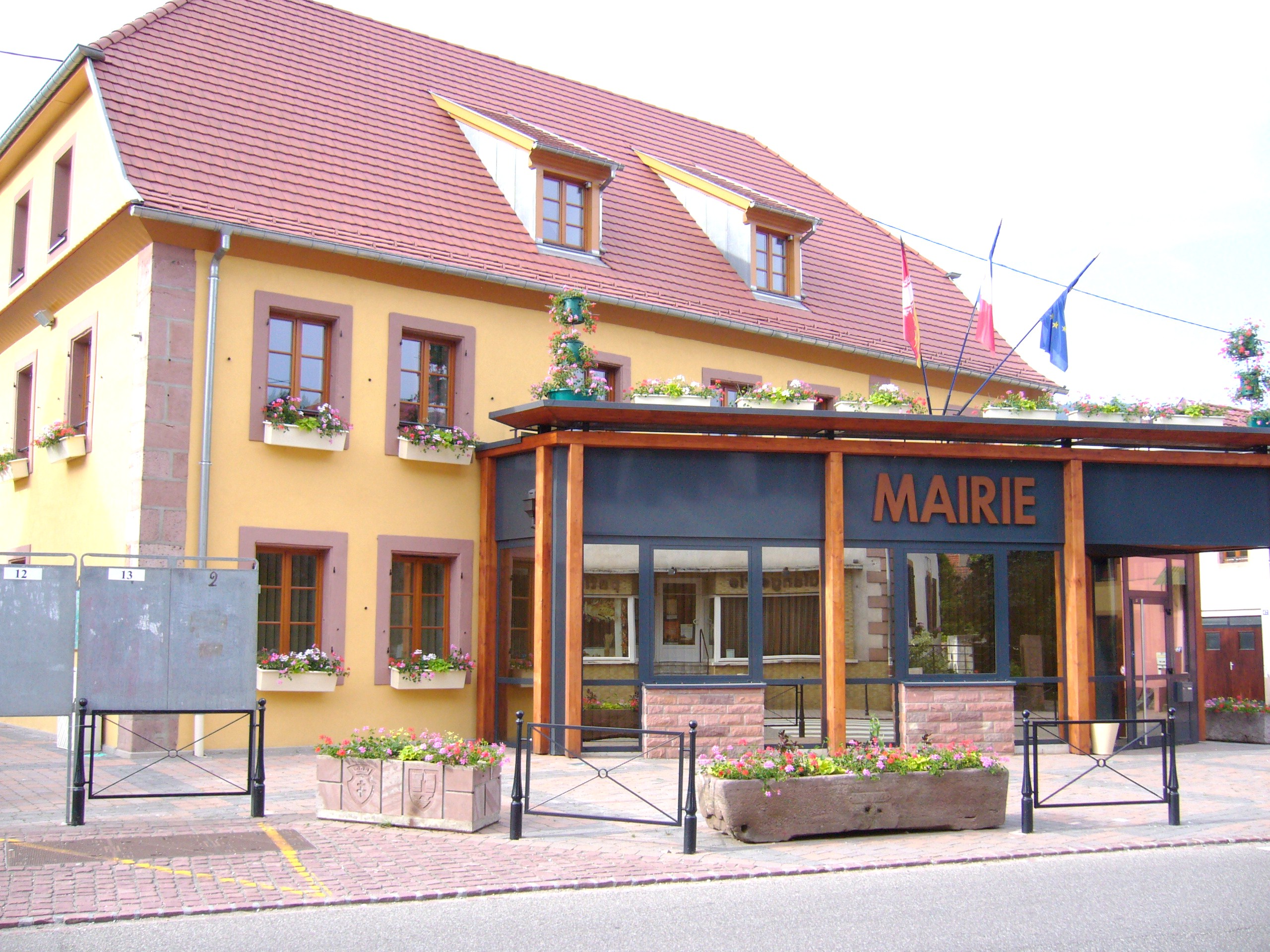
Lièpvre's city hall

On 6 February 2004, thirteenth-century frescoes were discovered under the vaults of the choir of the old church during the renovation of the new church. These frescoes dated from between 1200 and 1250, and were preserved with the choir after the rest of the church was demolished in 1751.

=== Battles and invasions ===
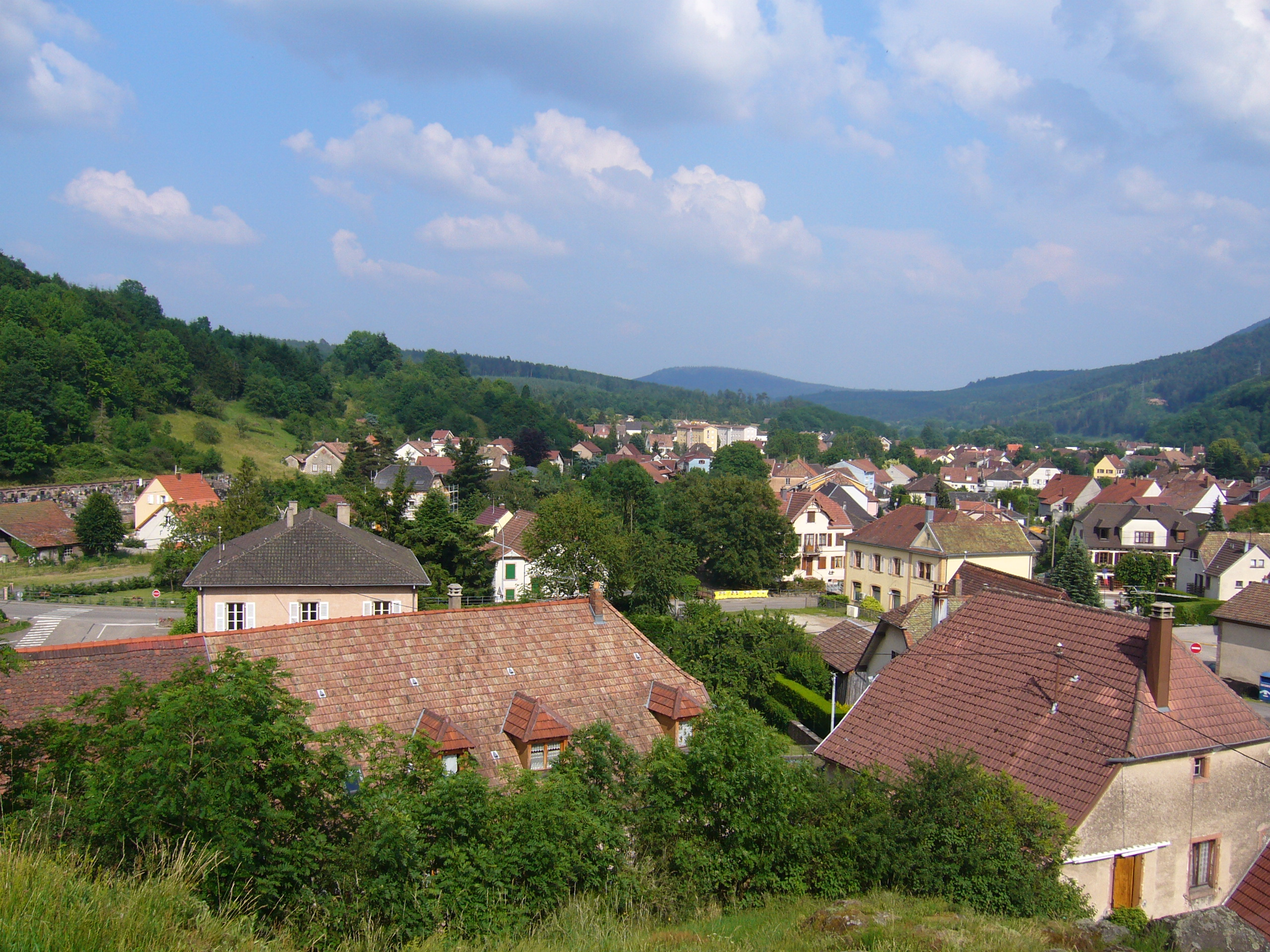
Lièpvre since Collinière

Conrad de Lichtenberg, bishop of Strasbourg attacked the valley in the thirteenth century. Troops made frequent raids on the valley, particularly against Lièpvre. Before this, frequent battles took place between Lichtenberg and Lorraine until 1290, when a girl related to the Duke of Lorraine married Conrad de Fribourg. The marriage was celebrated at the bishop's palace in Strasbourg and was followed by forty-eight years of peace between Strasbourg and Lorraine.

In 1331 Jean d'Echerick went to war against the Duke of Lorraine. Jean d'Echerick attacked Bertrimoutier, Provenchères-sur-Fave, Remomeix, and Sainte Marguerite. He kidnapped the canons Jean of Toulon, Geoffroy of Herbeuviller and Nicolas de Porcher, locked them into his dungeon, and demanded 750 livres tournois in ransom. In 1338 Lièpvre was at war against Berthold of Bucheck, the bishop of Strasbourg. Jean d'Echery commanded the troops of Sélestat. The bishop attacked the Valley of Lièpvre and besieged Echerick's castle, accompanied by troops loyal to Jean Senn, the Bishop of Basel. Lièpvre and Rombach-le-Franc burned and Lièpvre's convent was partially destroyed.

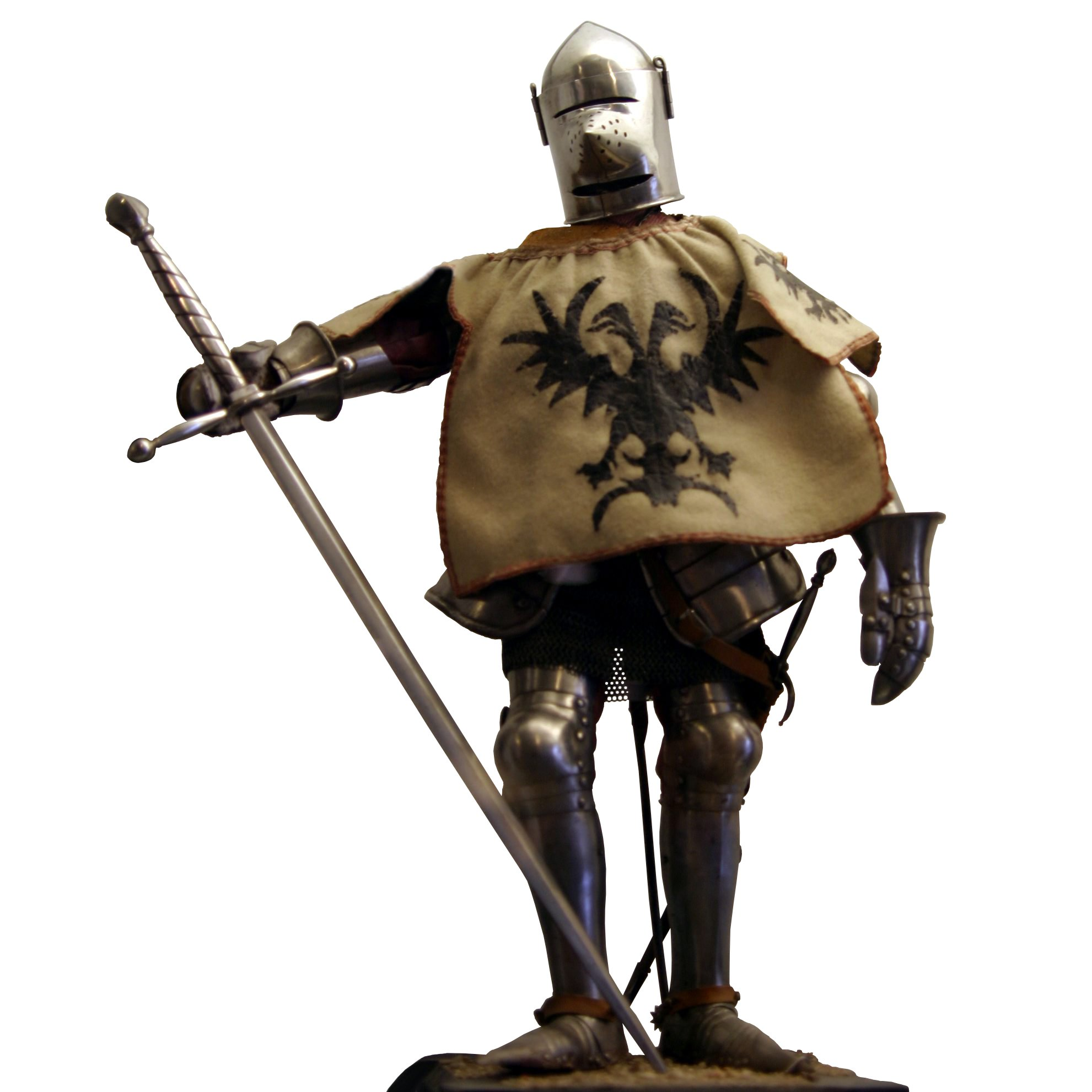
Complete armor of patche, with arm beak, a knight of the big companies, carrying Bertrand du Gueslin's blazon

On July 4, 1365, the valley was attacked by 40,000 mercenaries hired by Arnaud de Cervole. They set fire to Lièpvre, Rombach-le-Franc and Saint Croix-aux-Mines. On May 25, 1366 Arnaud de Cervole was killed near Mâcon during a quarrel with one of his people as he tried to collect the mercenaries scattered in Languedoc.

=== The Armagnacs in the valley ===
The Armagnacs were armed gangs of former mercenaries in France during the fifteenth century under Charles VII's reign. They acted as soldiers of fortune, living on plunder and randoms during peacetime. They were prevalent throughout France during the reigns of Jean II and Charles V. After the French-English armistice of 1444, Charles VII employed a militia of 30,000 French, English, and Spanish mercenaries against the Lorraine and Alsace. One thousand Scots also participated in this militia under the leadership of Jean de Mongommery with their headquarters in Châtenois.

The Armagnacs were under the control of the Dauphin Louis XI and entered Alsace in 1444, forcing cities and villages to surrender to their control. Lièpvre and Rombach-le-Franc surrendered to the Dauphin to avoid destruction, but Lièpvre was still attacked by the Armagnacs. The Armagnacs camped in Alsace for more than a year and left when Charles VII ordered them to evacuate the region during the spring of 1445. The Armagnacs were unexpectedly attacked by troops from the city of Schlestadt (Sélestat).

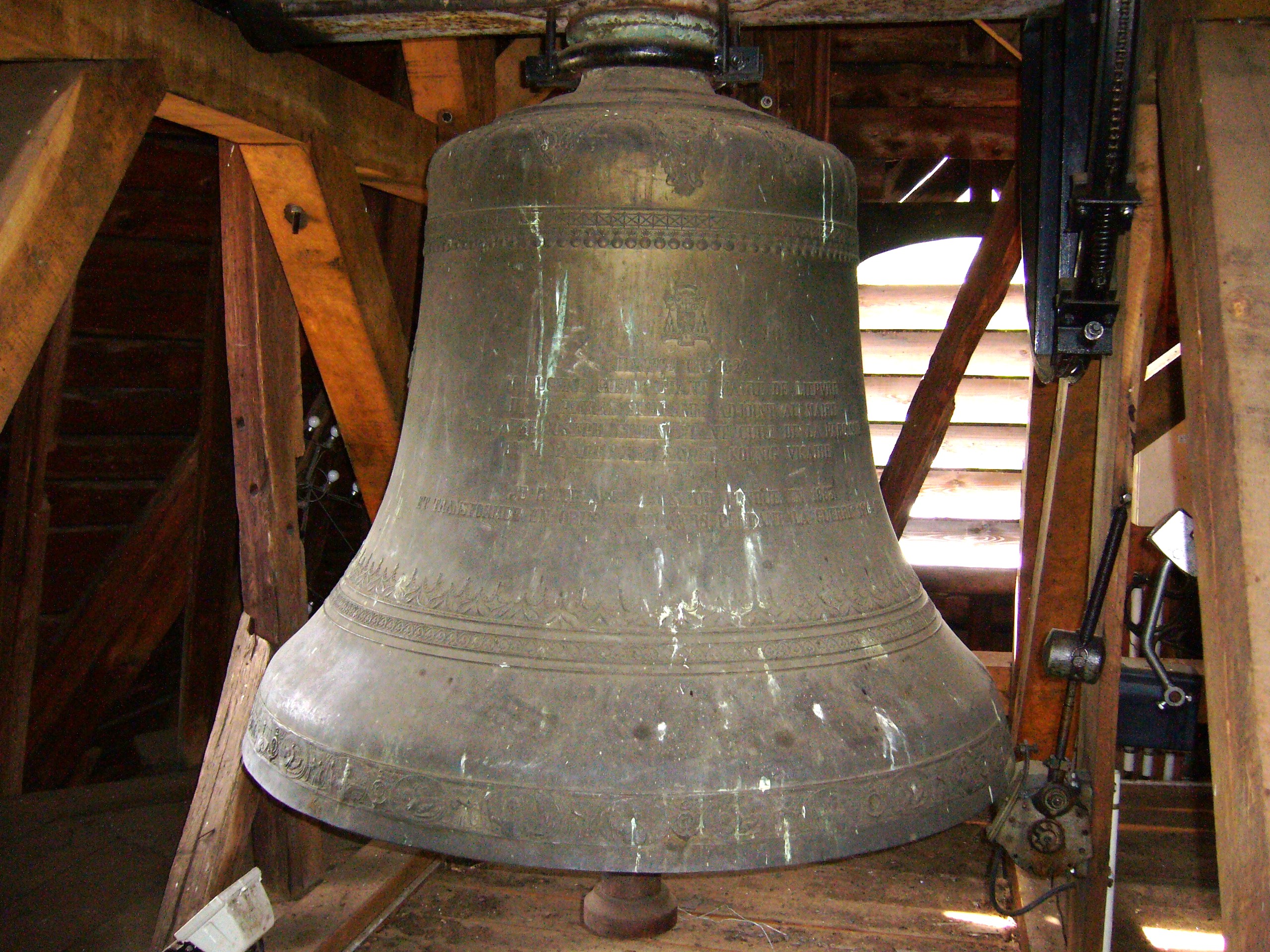
The ancient bell of 1542 placed on the bell tower of Lièpvre's church

Coats of arms of the counts of Armagnac: Argent, a lion gules

Troops from Strasbourg took revenge on the inhabitants of Lièpvre and Rombach-le-Franc for initially supporting the Armagnacs' entrance into the Lièpvrette valley. They plundered the valley, which probably is when Fulrad's bones disappeared from Lièpvre's priory.

=== Conflict between Duke Antoine of Lorraine and the Lord of Geroldseck ===
Duke Antoine of Lorraine and the Lord of Geroldeck fought over the mines in the Valley of Lièpvre. Antoine was aided by 6000 troops sent by François de Sickingen and seized Saint-Hippolyte by surprise. Antoine also defeated the troops from Geroldseck who were blocking passage into the valley. Residents of Saint-Hippolyte that allowed troops from Geroldeck into the valley were punished by Anoine after he reclaimed the valley.

== Places and monuments ==
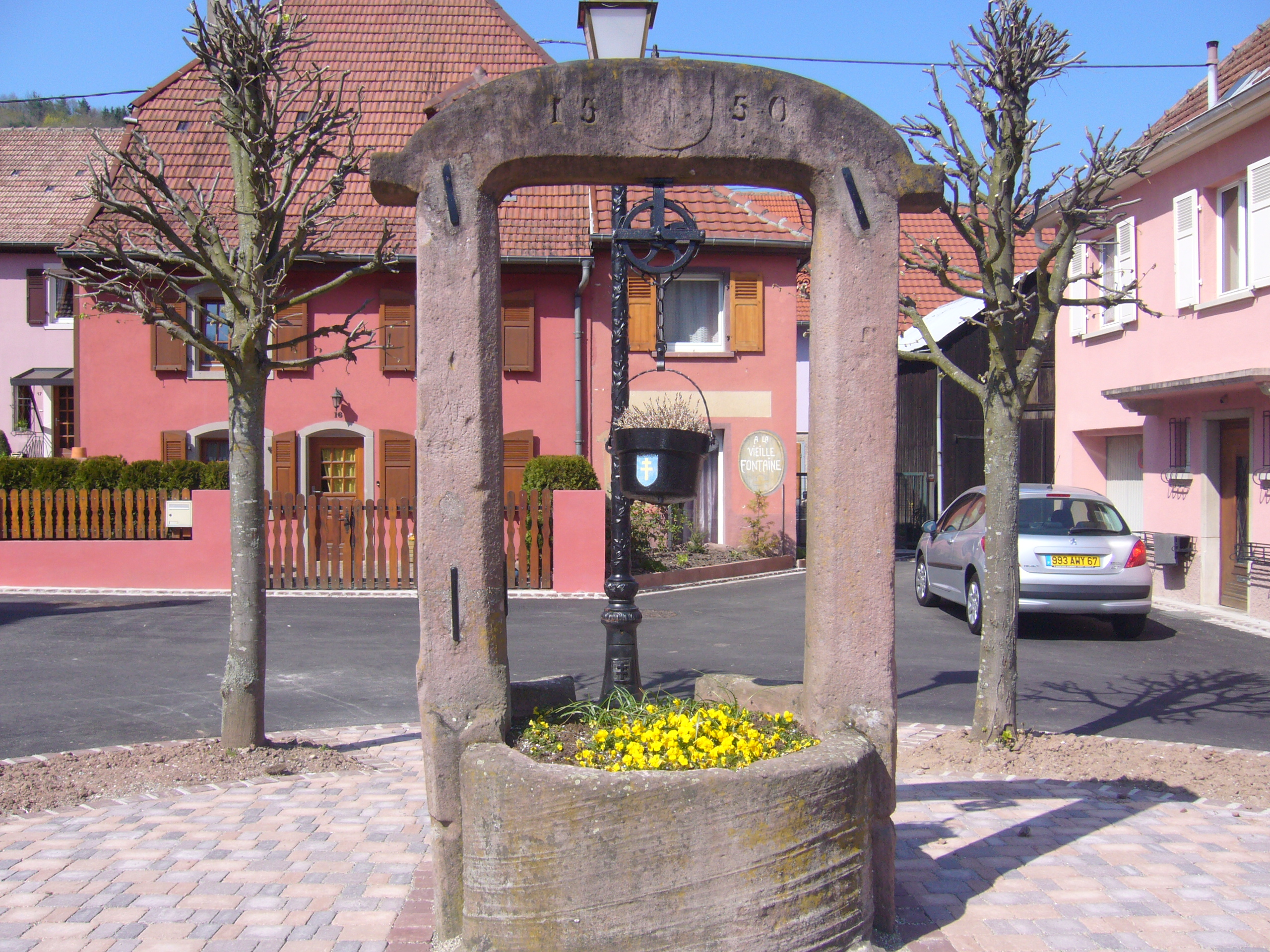
Old Fountain (1550)

=== Old fountain ===
The old fountain is on Clemenceau Street and has two large pillars with a crossbar marked with the year 1550. The fountain itself is not marked with any date.

=== Churches ===
A Romanic chapel build at the end of the eleventh century stands next to Lièpvre's Church of the Assumption. The chapel was renovated in the seventeenth century with coupled windows and columns. This chapel was classified as a registered historic memorial on March 22, 1934.

Lord Echery's grave from the former chapel was placed outside the new church in 1790. The gravestone was moved into the Church of the Assumption in 1998.

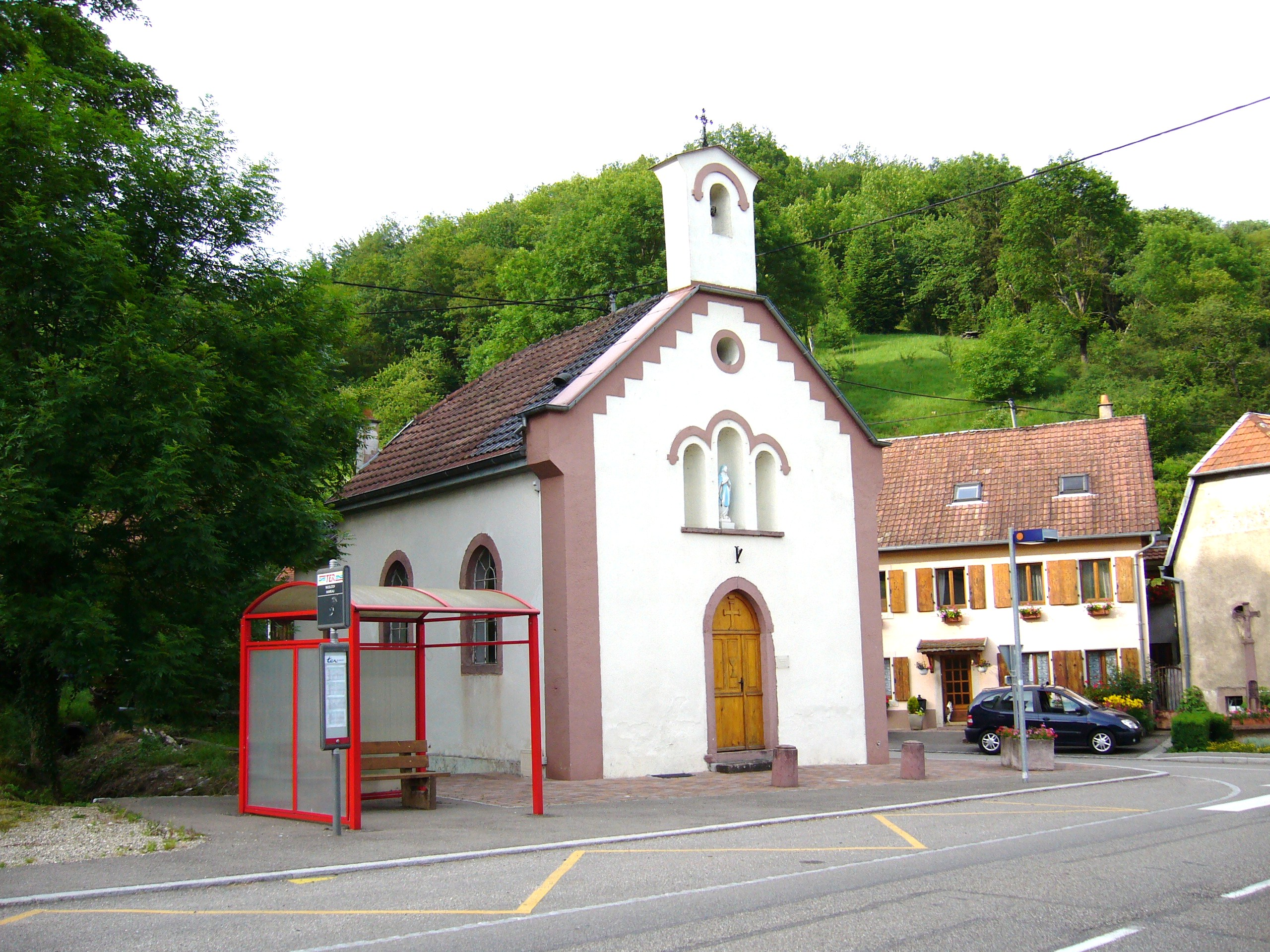
Chapel of Musloch to Lièpvre

Another chapel, Our Lady of the Sacred Heart and is placed in front of a former school. This chapel was built in 1905 where a former house burned down in 1903.

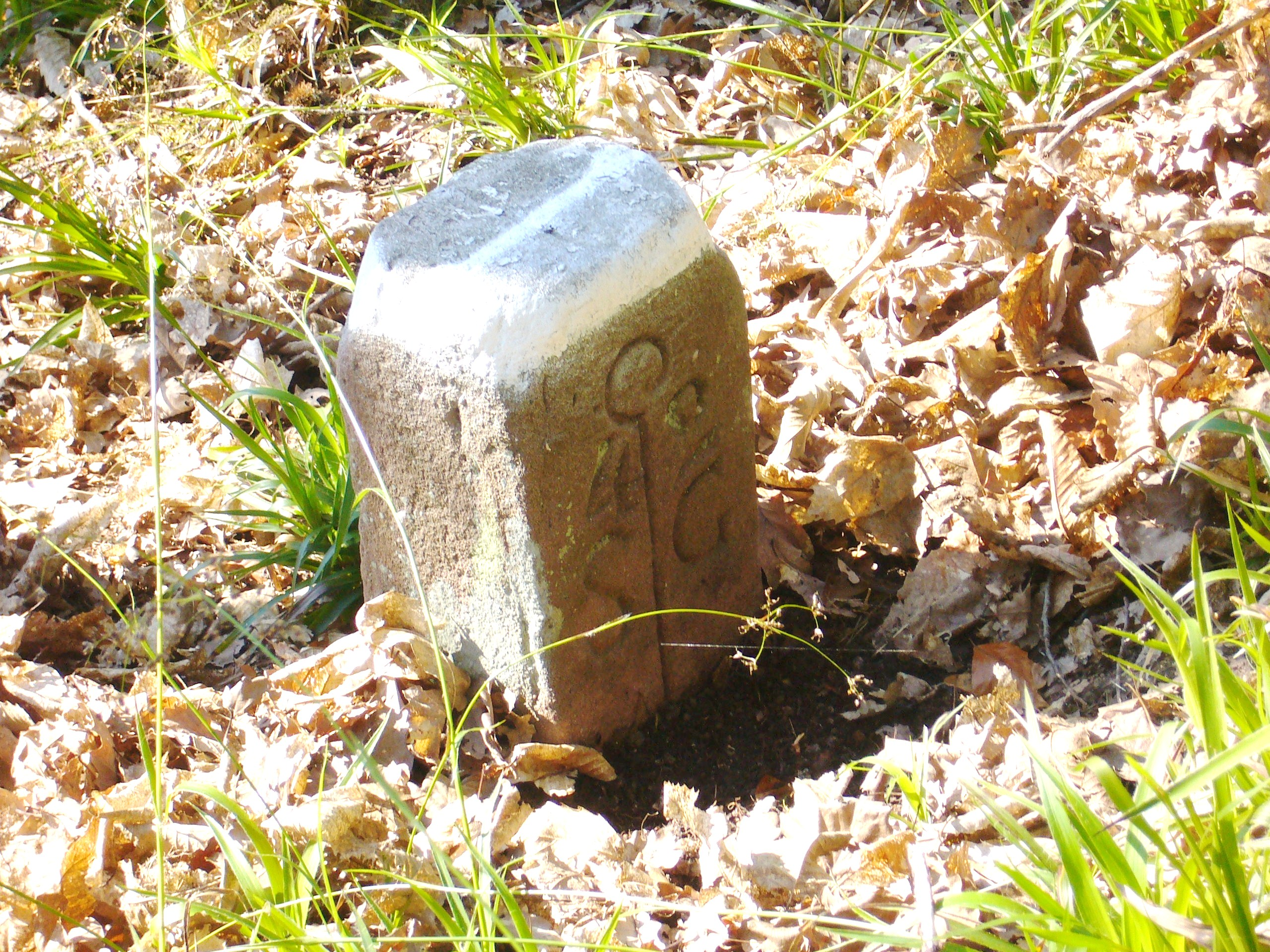
Cadastrale border n°42 of the Saint Georges collegiate church situated in Vaurière to Lièpvre

Four borders bounding the grounds that belonged to Lièpvre's priory in the town of Vaurière, are dated 1680 and marked with the letters S.G. (for Saint Georges). These grounds have been occupied by the Saint Georges Collegiate Church of Nancy since 1502.

=== Restoration of Our Lady of the Assumption ===
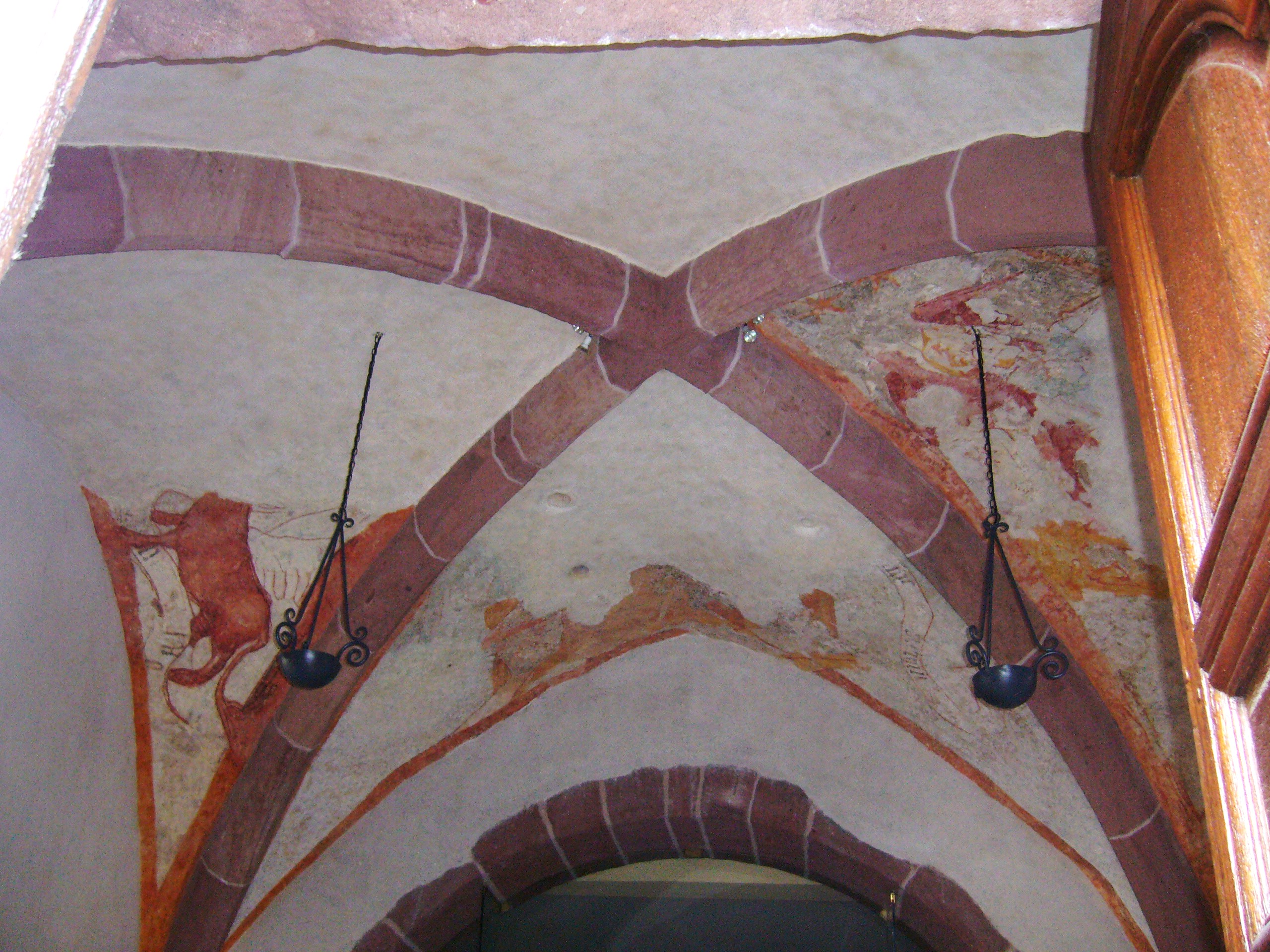
Frescoes of the 13th century under the vault of the bell tower of Lièpvre's church

Frescoes dating from the thirteenth century were discovered on 6 February 2004 during restoration work on the church of Our Lady of the Assumption. The paintings are under the vault of the former chapel in the entrance to the hall of the current church. Workmen uncovered the frescoes under a layer of plaster while cleaning the ceiling. The frescoes depict Saint Mark, Saint Matthew, Saint John, Saint Luke, a lion and a bull. These frescoes were seriously damaged in 1917 when the church bells were requisitioned by the Germans during World War I. The church entrance, including the former choir of the old church, was reopened on Sunday 2 April 2006, after a twenty-year restoration project. Originally, the choir and the altar faced east according to tradition, but following successive enlargements of the church they were eventually moved to face west. The choir and altar were reoriented during the restoration project to face east again.

=== Fountain of Saint Alexander ===
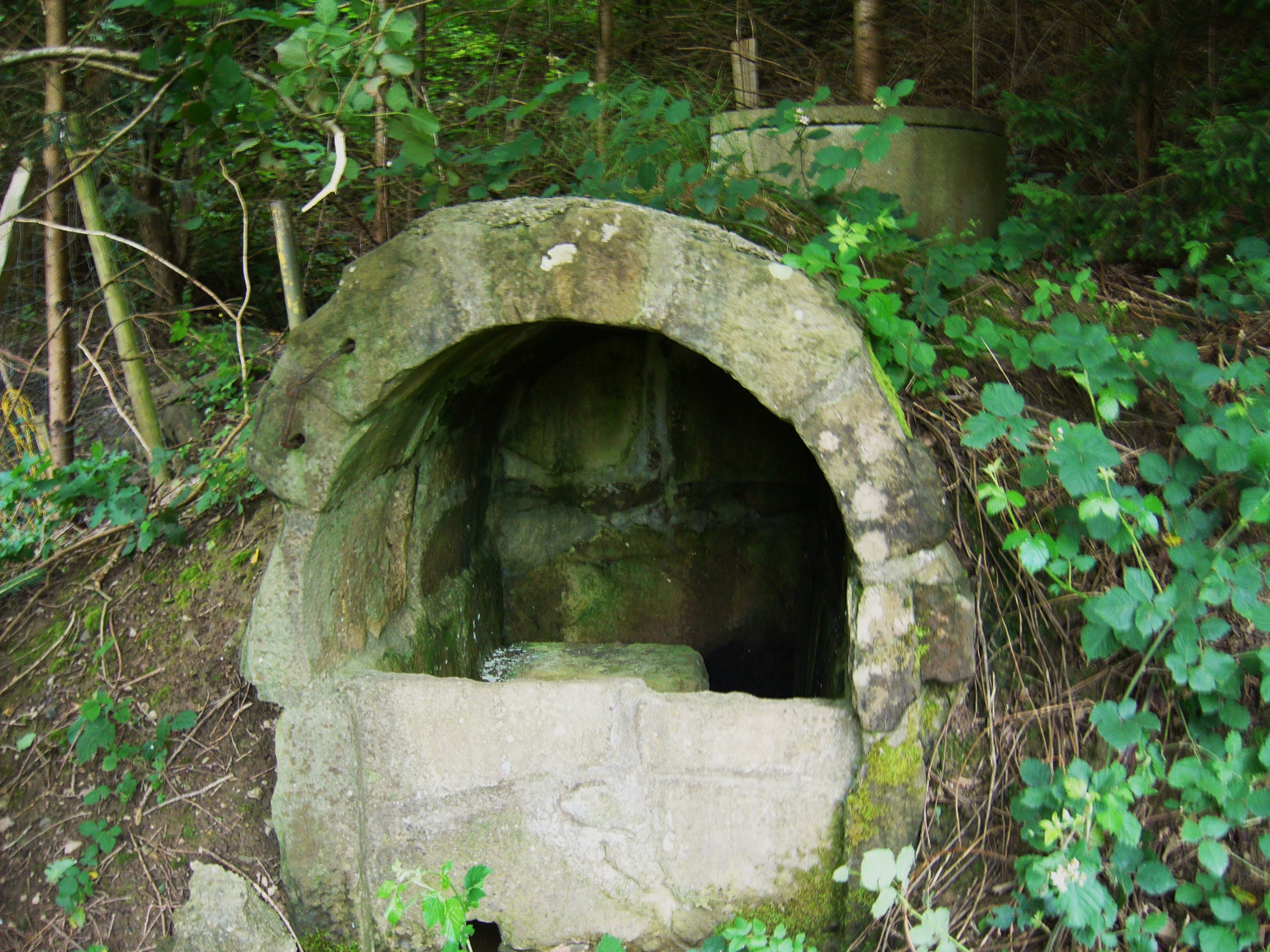
The former vestige of the high Middle Age: the fountain Saint Alexander to Lièpvre

The fountain of Saint Alexander was discovered by accident in 1987 in the locality of Raincorne south of Lièpvre. A few children from Lièpvre were building a small dam when they uncovered the ruins. They discovered an ancient shaft from the Early Middle Ages, possibly from the time of Abbot Fulrad. This fountain was supplied by a tank located near the priory. Waters thought to cure eye diseases were frequently named after Saint Alexander during the Middle Ages; pilgrims came from the plain of Alsace and from the Vosges to collect water from this fountain. Monks from the Priory of Lièpvre constructed a conduit of bored wooden pipes joined together by hand-forged scraps of iron. The source of the water used for the fountain still exists today, though the basin was moved twenty meters north in June 1990 to avoid being buried by road works on the RN59. The fountain carried Alexander's name in memory of relics of Saint Alexander Fulrad had brought from Rome in 763.

== See also ==
- Communes of the Haut-Rhin département

== Bibliography ==
- Albrecht, Karl: Rappolsteinisches Urkundenbuch, Vol.5, 1898, Colmar
- Belhomme (Père Humbert, dom) Historia Mediani in Monte Vosago Monasterii, Argentorati, Ordinis sancti Benedicti, ex Congregation sanctorum Vitoni et Hidulfi (actore H.Belhomme), Argentorat (Strasbourg), sumptibus, J.R.Dusseckeri, 1724, 469 pages
- Bourgeois, Jules: L'Eglise du prieuré de Lièpvre aux 7e et VIIIe siècle - Revue d'Alsace, 1901, p. 232–241
- Bourgeois, Jules: Notes pour servir à l'histoire du Val de Lièpvre au XVIIe siècle, Récits détachés, Rixheim, F. Sutter et Cie, 1910, 78 pages
- Bourgeois, Jules: Notices sur deux anciennes cloches du Val de Lièpvre- Bulletin de la Société pour la conservation des monuments historiques d'Alsace, 4 pages, 1897
- Bourgeois, Jules: L'Eglise du prieuré de Lièpvre aux 17e et XVIIIe siècle: Revue d'Alsace, 1901, p. 232–241; 1902 p. 252 ss; 1904 p. 449 ss
- Büttner, H. Lothringen und Leberau - Westmärkische Abhandlung zur Landes und Volksforschung, 1941, t.1, p. 59-84
- Brière, Léon: Donation du territoire d'Andolsheims au prieuré de Lièpvre par l'abbé Fulrade - Revue d'Alsace, 1909, p. 314-317
- Büttner, Heinrich: Lothringen und Leberau, Westmärkische Abhanslungen zur Landes und Volksforschung, t.5, 1941–1942, Kaiserslautern, p. 59 à 84
- D'Ayzac Félicie: Histoire de l'Abbaye de Saint-Denis - Imprimerie impériale, Paris, 1861
- Degermann, Jules: La donation de Charlemagne au prieuré de Lièpvre en 774 - Bulletin de la Société pour la conservation des monuments historiques d'Alsace, 1892, 31 pages
- Delaborde, Fr. et Petit Dutaillis Ch. - Recueil des actes de Philippe Auguste, roi de France, tome II, Paris, 1943, n°543, p. 92-93
- Denis, Philippe: Les Eglises d'Etrangers en pays rhénans (1358–1564), Paris, les Belles lettres, 1984
- Diebold, E. Sinaublatter vom Grenzstein. Gedischte und Bilder aus dem Lebertal, Markirch (Ste Marie-aux-Mines), E. et R. Cellarius, 1910, 95 pages
- Dubruel, Marc (Père SJ). - Fulrad, archichapelain des premiers rois carolingiens et abbé de Saint-Denis en France in: Revue d'Alsace, 1901 et 1902
- Dubruel, Marc (Père S.J.) - Fulrad, abbé de Saint-Denis, Typ. F. Sutter & Cie, Rixheim, Librairie H.Hüffel, Colmar, 1902
- Dupraz : Le royaume des Francs et l'ascension politique des maires du palais au déclin du VIIe siècle (656-680), 1948, Fribourg en Suisse - (Evocation du maire Wulfoald, p. 102)
- Doublet, Dom J. - Histoire de l'abbaye de Saint Denys en France, Paris, 1625
- Giry, Athur: Notices bibliographiques sur les archives des églises et monastères de l'époque carolingienne, Editeur: Emile Bouillon, 1901
- Grandidier Ph. And. - Oeuvres inédites de Ph. And. Grandidier, tome 1, Colmar, 1865, Revue d'Alsace
- Grandidier, abbé: Histoire de l'église de Strasbourg depuis la foundation de l'évêché jusqu'à nos jours, tome 1, 1775, Imprimerie Levrault, Strasbourg
- Gross, Rolf: Papsturkunden in Frankreich, Neue Folge, 9, Band Diözese Paris II, Abtei Saint-Denis, Göttingen: Vandenhoeck & Ruprecht, 1998, 257 pages. (Abhandlung der Akademie der Wissenschaffen in Göttingen, Philologisch Historische Klasse, Dritte Folge, 225
- Herr. E - Bemerkenswerte Mittelalterliche Schenkungen in Elsass - Beiträge Zur Landes - Und Volkeskunde in Elsass-Lothringen. XXXIV. J.H.ED.Heitz & Mündel, Strassburg, 1908
- Kroeber, Auguste: Choix des pièces inédites. Charte de Fulrad, abbé de Saint-Denis, 777, Paris F. Didot frères, 1856 - Bibliothèque de l'Ecole des Chartes - Don du domaine d'Ansulsisheim à l'abbaye de Lièpvre
- Kroeber, Auguste: Diplôme de Lothaire, roi de France au prieuré de Lièpvre - Revue d'Alsace, 1868, p. 527-528
- Kroeber, Auguste: Choix de pièces inédites. Charte de Fulrad, abbé de Saint-Denys, 777, Paris, F. Didot Frères, 1856, Bibliothèque de l'école des Chartes - Don du domaine d'Ansulsisheim à l'abbaye de Lièpvre
- Kuentzmann, Victor: La maison des ducs de Lorraine à Lièpvre, Elsassland, 1929, p. 77-78
- Kuentzmann, Victor: Le souvenir de Charlemagne à Lièpvre, ZLH, t.14, 1934, pp. 199–201
- Kuentzmann, victor: La maison des ducs de Lorraine à Lièpvre, mein Elsassland, 1929, t. IX, p. 77
- Kuentzmann, Victor: Saint Cucufat, patron de l'ancienne église paroissiale de Lièpvre et de Sainte-Croix-aux-Mines jusqu'au 18e siècle, ELH, t.16, 1936, p. 209-210
- Laguille, R.père Louis: Histoire de la province d'Alsace depuis Jules César jusqu'au mariage de Louis XV Roy de France et de Navarre - Jean Renaud Doulssecker, Strasbourg 1724
- Langenbeck, Fritz: Studien zur elsässischen Siedlungsgeschichte Vom Weiterleben der vorgermanischen Toponymie in deurschprachigen Elsass - I. Band - Verlag Konkordia AH, Bühl/baden, 1967
- Lauer, Philippe: Recueil des actes de Charles III le Simple, roi de France, Paris, 1940, N°XLVII, p. 103-105
- Mabillon: Acta sanctorum ordinis sancti Benedicti Lutétiae Parisiorun, 1668-1701 - 9 volumes, Venetiis, 1733–1738
- Mabillon: Annales ordinis sancti Benedicti, Parisiis, 1703–1739, 6 volumes, Lucae, 1739
- Modeste de Saint-Amable, E. - Monarchie sainte, Paris, 1670–1677
- Picart, Benoit (Le père); Histoire écclésiastique et politique de la ville et du diocèse de Toul, 1707
- Parisse, Michel: Saint-Denis et ses biens en Lorraine et en Alsace: Bulletin Philologique et historique jusqu'à 1610 du Comité des travaux historiques et scientifiques, 1967 - Acte du 92e Congrès national des sociétés savantes tenu à Strasbourg et Colmar, VoL. 1 - Paris - Bibliothèque Nationale, 1969
- Rapp (abbé)- (The former vicar of the diocese of Strasbourg), Saint-Fulrade, chanoine de Saint-Denis Typographie E. Bauer, Strasbourg, 1883, 258 pages
- Sitzmann, Edouard: Dictionnaire de biographies des hommes célèbres de l'Alsace, Rixheim, Imprimerie F. Sutter 1 Cie, 1910
- Stoclet, Alain: Autour de Fulrad de Saint-Denis (v.710-784)- Haute Etudes Médiévales et modernes, Librairie Droz S.A., Genève, 695 pages, 1993
- Tardif, Jules: Archives de l'Empire, Cartons des rois, 1866 (This book analyze and publishes the charters of the National Archives in the séries K, said with "Monuments historiques". One finds the analysis of these details relative to Lièpvre in the Inventory of des "Cartons des Rois") (Reprinting by Kraus Reprint, 1976. Introduction par L. Laborde (Inventaires K 1 à 164)
- Tessier, Georges: Recueil des actes de Charles II le Chauve, tome II, (861-877), Paris, 1952
- Tribout de Morembert, H. - Fulrad in: Dictionnaire de biographie française, Paris, 1979, collection 1436-1437
- Will, Robert: Données historiques et archéologiques sur la prieurale romane de Lièpvre, in: Revue alsacienne d'archéologien d'art et d'histoire, 28, 1985, p. 83–98
- Will, Robert: Le vitrail de Charlemagne à Lièpvre. Evocation d'une oeuvre d'art disparue, in: Cahier alsaciens d'archéologie, d'art et d'histoire 21, 1978, p. 87–101
- Wilsdorf, Ch.: Les destinées du prieuré de Lièpvre jusqu'à l'an 1000 in: Annuaire de la Société des amis de la bibliothèque de Sélestat, p. 120–134, 1963

Author's nameless work:

- Die Tage des Vier und fechsunszwanzigften februars 1844 in Leberthale, Zu Schlettstadt, bei F. Helbig, Buchbruder - Strassburg, bei Schmidt und Bruder und Mariakitch, bei Gergard, Buchhanler, 30 pages (Speak about the flood to Lièpvre in 1844)
