= Canton of Brouvelieures =

Coordinates: 48°14′11″N 6°43′27″E

Brouvelieures
- Former canton
- Interactive map of Brouvelieures
- Country: France
- Region: Grand Est
- Department: Vosges
- No. of communes: {{{nbcomm}}}
- Disbanded: 2015
- Area: 88.85 km^{2} (34.31 sq mi)
- Population (2012): 2,677
  - Density: 30.13/km^{2} (78.03/sq mi)

The Canton of Brouvelieures is a former French administrative and electoral grouping of communes in the Vosges département of eastern France and in the region of Lorraine. It was disbanded following the French canton reorganisation which came into effect in March 2015. It consisted of 10 communes, which joined the canton of Bruyères in 2015. It had 2,677 inhabitants (2012).

One of 9 cantons in the arrondissement of Saint-Dié-des-Vosges, the canton of Brouvelieures had its administrative centre at Brouvelieures.

== Composition ==
The Canton of Brouvelieures comprised the following 10 communes:

- Belmont-sur-Buttant
- Biffontaine
- Bois-de-Champ
- Brouvelieures
- Domfaing
- Fremifontaine
- Mortagne
- Les Poulières
- Les Rouges-Eaux
- Vervezelle
