= Saint-Léonard, Vosges =

Saint-Léonard
- Commune
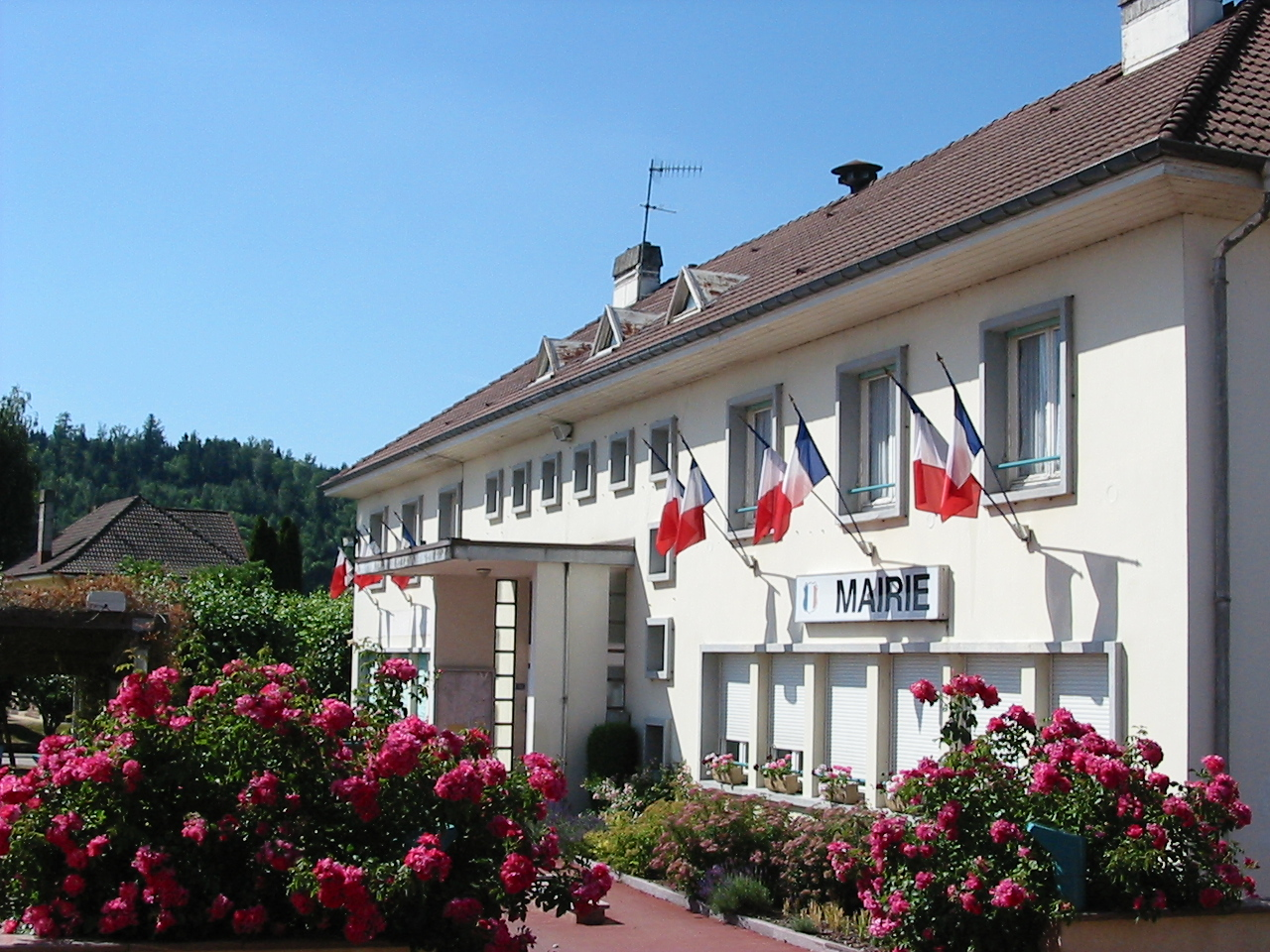
- The town hall in Saint-Léonard
- Location of Saint-Léonard
- Location within France Location within Grand Est
- Coordinates: 48°13′02″N 6°56′40″E
- Country: France
- Region: Grand Est
- Department: Vosges
- Arrondissement: Saint-Dié-des-Vosges
- Canton: Saint-Dié-des-Vosges-2
- Intercommunality: CA Saint-Dié-des-Vosges

Government
  - Mayor (2023–2026): Catherine Mathieu
- Area^{1}: 14.57 km^{2} (5.63 sq mi)
- Elevation: 417 m (1,368 ft)
- Highest elevation: 691 m (2,267 ft)
- Lowest elevation: 397 m (1,302 ft)
- Population (2023): 1,389
  - Density: 95.33/km^{2} (246.9/sq mi)
- Time zone: UTC+01:00 (CET)
  - Summer (DST): UTC+02:00 (CEST)
- INSEE/Postal code: 88423 /88650
- ^{1} French Land Register data, which excludes lakes, ponds, glaciers > 1 km^{2} (0.386 sq mi or 247 acres) and river estuaries.

Saint-Léonard (French pronunciation: [sɛ̃ leɔnaʁ]) is a commune in the Vosges department in Grand Est in northeastern France.

== Geography ==
The village lies in the eastern part of the commune, some 7.5 km (4.7 mi) south of Saint-Dié-des-Vosges, on the left bank of the river Meurthe.

The river Mortagne has its source in the western part of the commune.

== See also ==
- Communes of the Vosges department
