= Pierre de Laitre =

- Location within France

Highest point
- Elevation: 624 m (2,047 ft)
- Coordinates: 48°15′23″N 6°54′26″E

Geography
- Location: Saint-Dié, Vosges, France
- Parent range: Vosges

Geology
- Rock age: Triassic
- Mountain type: Sandstone butte

The Pierre de Laitre, or Pierre de l'Aître is a stone at 624 metres (2,047 ft) above sea level that forms the summit of a wooded sandstone mountain of the same name in the Kemberg massif to the north of the town of Taintrux, in the canton of Saint-Dié, department of Vosges. The mountain overlooks the old cemetery, or l'aître of Taintrux, from which the stone and the mountain take their name.

== Description ==
Pierre de Laitre, the highest point, gives its name to a small sandstone mount in the Vosges mountains, a Triassic sandstone butte in the eroded part of the Kemberg massif dominating the Taintroué valley. The summit is a large sandstone rock that has been separated from the underlying sandstone layers by time and weather. Most of the small wooded mount, which includes the Forest of Chaumont rising separately to 620 metres (2,030 ft) above sea level, was once grass-covered and exposed to the wind.

The inhabitants of Taintrux use the mountain for walking. It is near the town of Saint-Dié-des-Vosges and close to the Sentier des Ducs (GR355). The Pierre de Laitre, at 624 metres (2,047 ft) above sea level, is easily accessible after a climb of 150 metres (490 ft) from the Grandrupt forest road in the Kemberg massif. There is a gazebo on top of the stone with a protective barrier from which there is a good view over the valley and the village of Taintrux.

== Gallery ==
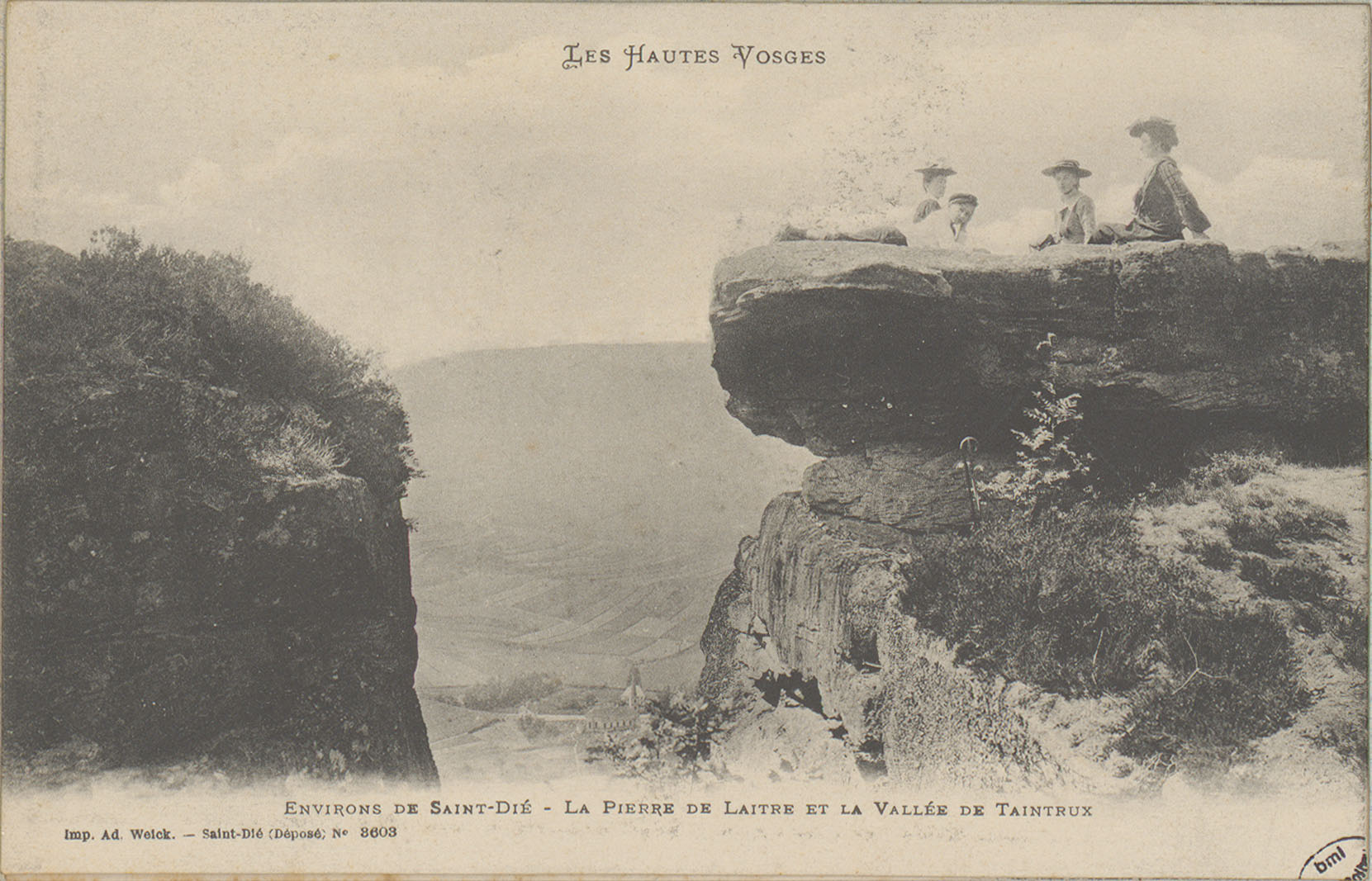
Pierre de Laitre and valley of Taintrux

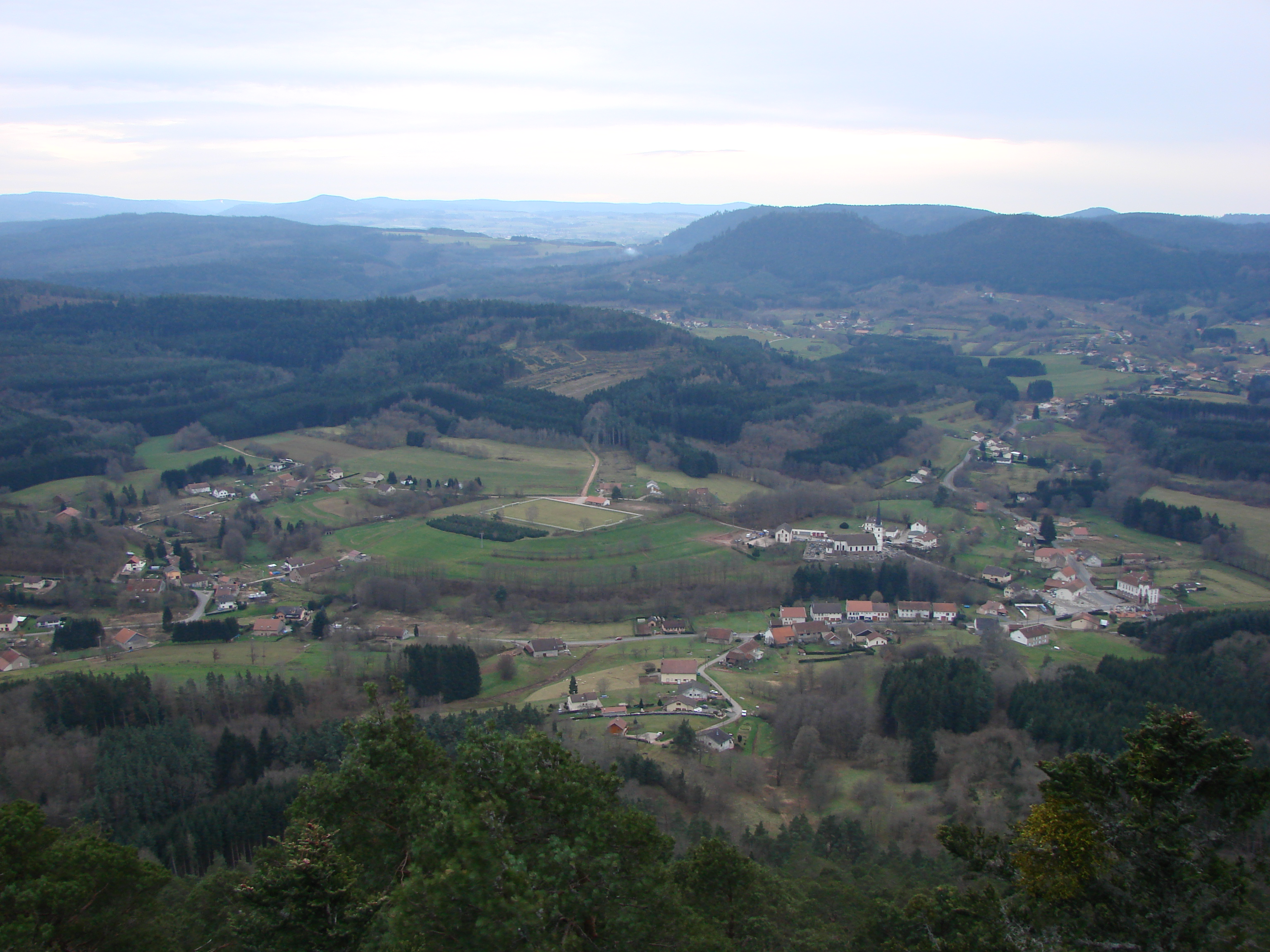
Panorama of the three valleys of Taintrux and the blue Vosges

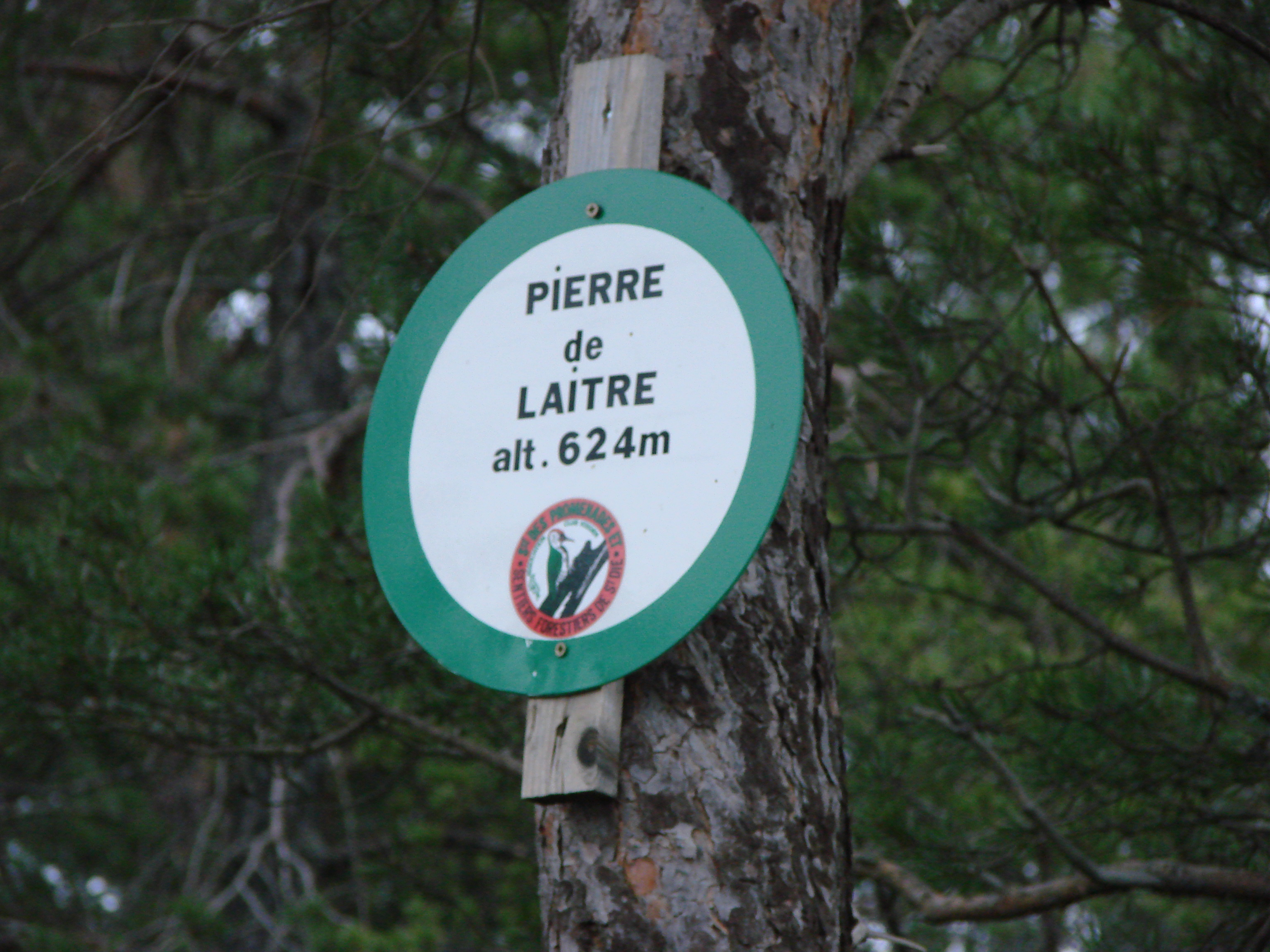
Altitude : 624 mètres

== Sources ==
- "Pierre de Laître". camptocamp.org.
