= Mont-sur-Meurthe =

- Commune
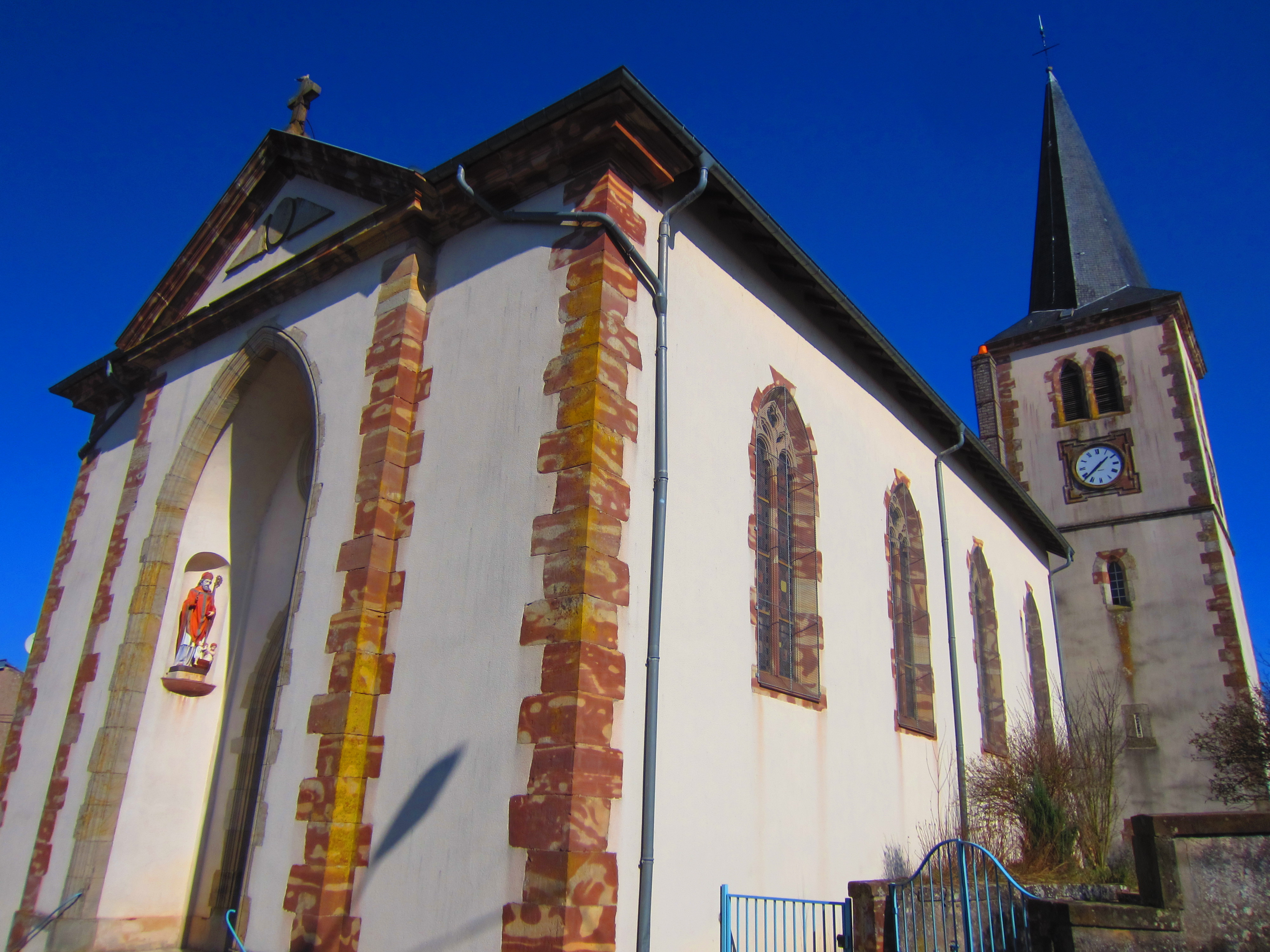
- The church in Mont-sur-Meurthe

- Coat of arms
- Location of Mont-sur-Meurthe
- Location within France Location within Grand Est
- Coordinates: 48°33′20″N 6°26′37″E
- Country: France
- Region: Grand Est
- Department: Meurthe-et-Moselle
- Arrondissement: Lunéville
- Canton: Lunéville-2
- Intercommunality: CC Meurthe, Mortagne, Moselle

Government
  - Mayor (2020–2026): Jonathan Kurkiency
- Area^{1}: 9.51 km^{2} (3.67 sq mi)
- Elevation: 230 m (750 ft)
- Highest elevation: 277 m (909 ft)
- Lowest elevation: 216 m (709 ft)
- Population (2023): 1,135
  - Density: 119/km^{2} (309/sq mi)
- Time zone: UTC+01:00 (CET)
  - Summer (DST): UTC+02:00 (CEST)
- INSEE/Postal code: 54383 /54360
- ^{1} French Land Register data, which excludes lakes, ponds, glaciers > 1 km^{2} (0.386 sq mi or 247 acres) and river estuaries.

Mont-sur-Meurthe (French pronunciation: [mɔ̃ syʁ mœʁt]) is a commune in the Meurthe-et-Moselle department in north-eastern France.

== Geography ==
The village lies in the middle of the commune, where the river Mortagne flows into the Meurthe.

== See also ==
- Communes of the Meurthe-et-Moselle department
