= Haudonville =

- Commune
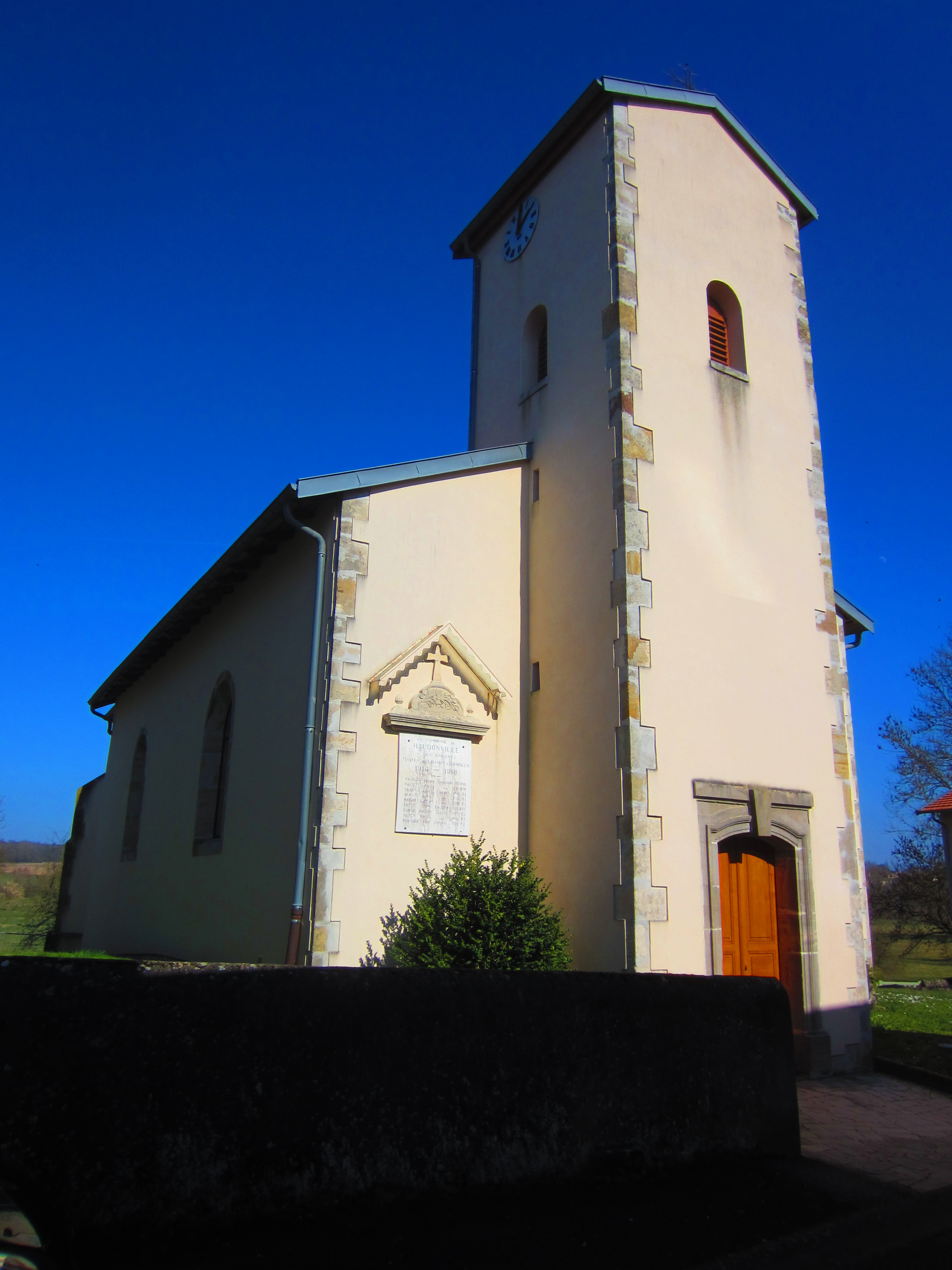
- The church in Haudonville

- Coat of arms
- Location of Haudonville
- Location within France Location within Grand Est
- Coordinates: 48°30′01″N 6°30′06″E
- Country: France
- Region: Grand Est
- Department: Meurthe-et-Moselle
- Arrondissement: Lunéville
- Canton: Lunéville-2
- Intercommunality: Territoire de Lunéville à Baccarat

Government
  - Mayor (2020–2026): Michel Gravier
- Area^{1}: 7.46 km^{2} (2.88 sq mi)
- Elevation: 240 m (790 ft)
- Highest elevation: 277 m (909 ft)
- Lowest elevation: 224 m (735 ft)
- Population (2023): 82
  - Density: 11/km^{2} (28/sq mi)
- Time zone: UTC+01:00 (CET)
  - Summer (DST): UTC+02:00 (CEST)
- INSEE/Postal code: 54255 /54830
- ^{1} French Land Register data, which excludes lakes, ponds, glaciers > 1 km^{2} (0.386 sq mi or 247 acres) and river estuaries.

Haudonville (French pronunciation: [odɔ̃vil]) is a commune in the Meurthe-et-Moselle department in north-eastern France.

== Geography ==
The village lies in the north-eastern part of the commune, on the left bank of the river Mortagne, which forms most of the commune's northern border.

== See also ==
- Communes of the Meurthe-et-Moselle department
