= Taintrux =

- Commune
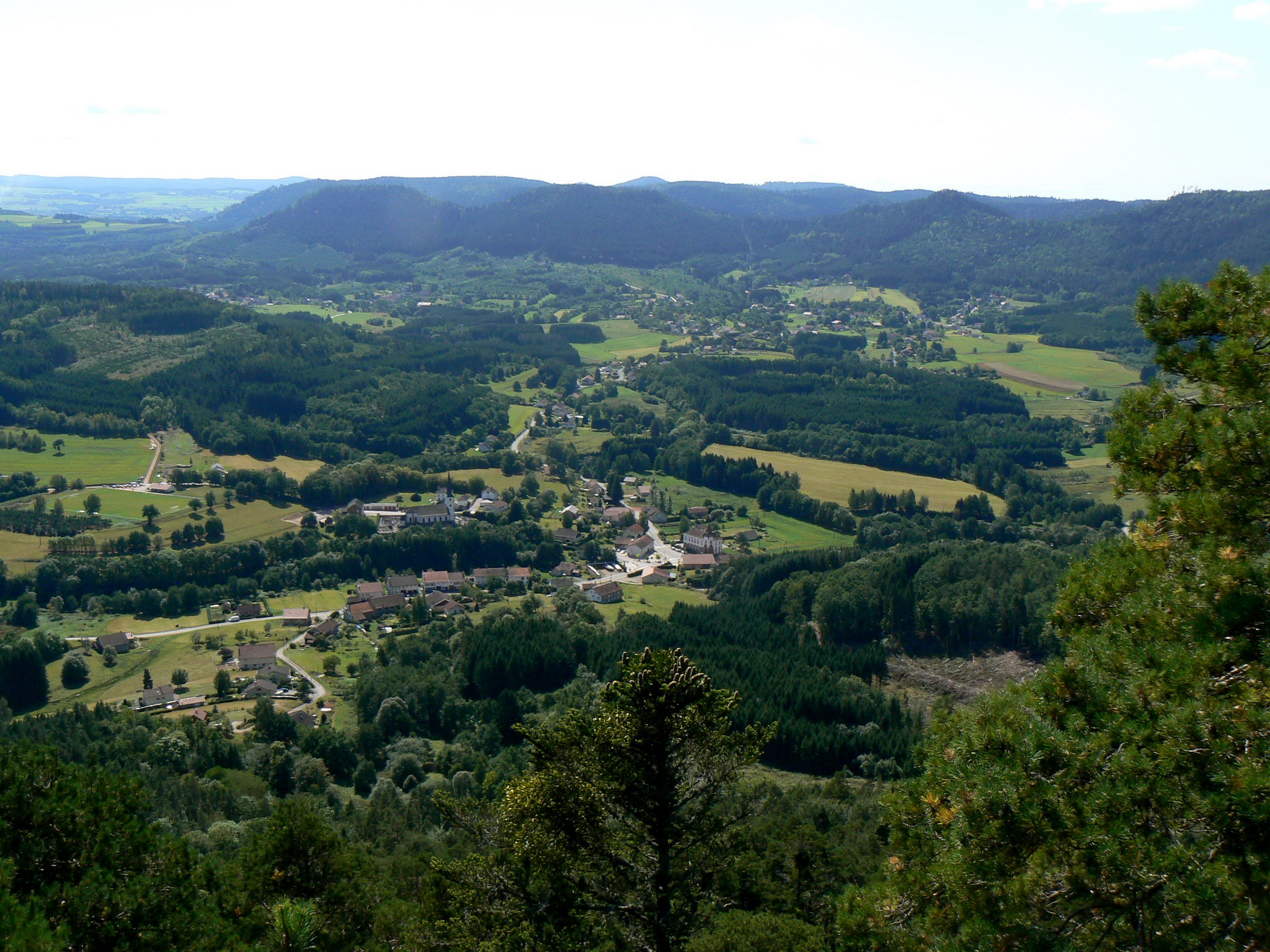
- A general view of Taintrux

- Coat of arms
- Location of Taintrux
- Location within France Location within Grand Est
- Coordinates: 48°15′01″N 6°54′10″E
- Country: France
- Region: Grand Est
- Department: Vosges
- Arrondissement: Saint-Dié-des-Vosges
- Canton: Saint-Dié-des-Vosges-1
- Intercommunality: CA Saint-Dié-des-Vosges

Government
  - Mayor (2020–2026): Pierre Chachay
- Area^{1}: 31.69 km^{2} (12.24 sq mi)
- Elevation: 395 m (1,296 ft)
- Highest elevation: 760 m (2,490 ft)
- Lowest elevation: 344 m (1,129 ft)
- Population (2023): 1,439
  - Density: 45.41/km^{2} (117.6/sq mi)
- Time zone: UTC+01:00 (CET)
  - Summer (DST): UTC+02:00 (CEST)
- INSEE/Postal code: 88463 /88100
- ^{1} French Land Register data, which excludes lakes, ponds, glaciers > 1 km^{2} (0.386 sq mi or 247 acres) and river estuaries.

Taintrux (French pronunciation: [tɛ̃tʁy]) is a village and commune in the Vosges department in Grand Est in northeastern France.

== Geography ==
The village lies at the foot of the Pierre de Laitre, a sandstone butte. The river Mortagne forms all of the commune's southwestern border.

== See also ==
- Communes of the Vosges department
