= Xermaménil =

- Commune
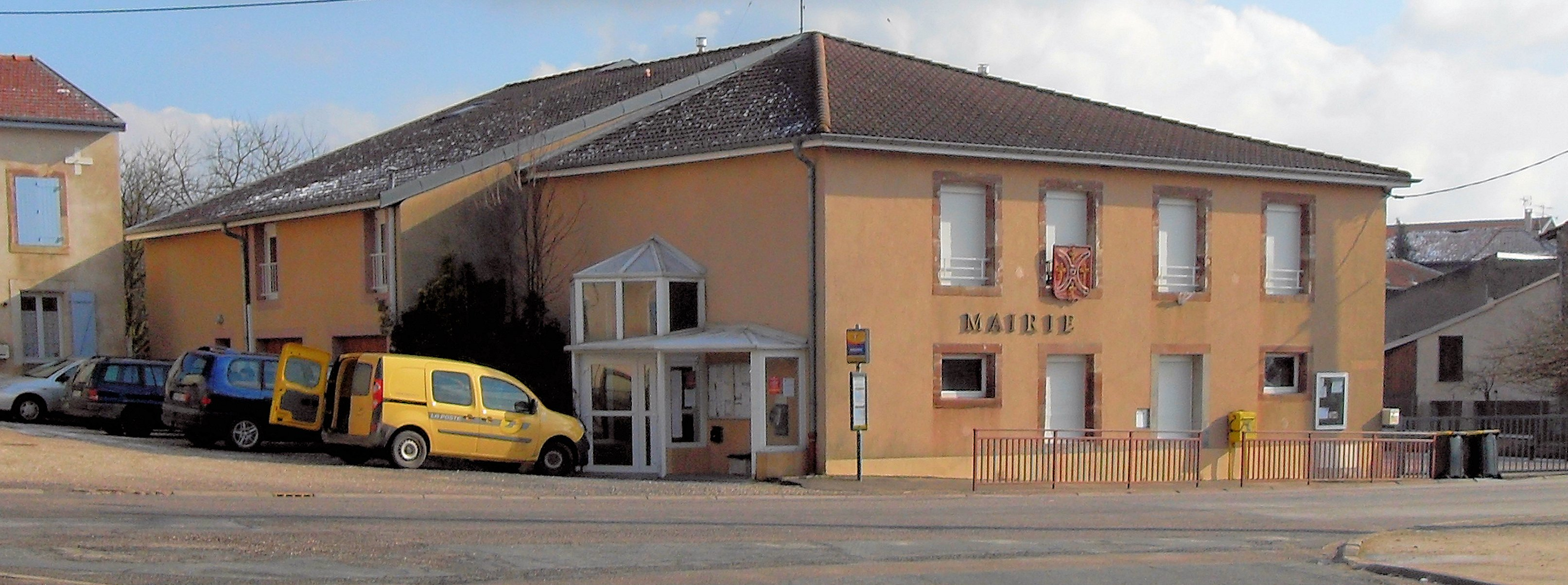
- The town hall in Xermaménil

- Coat of arms
- Location of Xermaménil
- Location within France Location within Grand Est
- Coordinates: 48°31′59″N 6°27′48″E
- Country: France
- Region: Grand Est
- Department: Meurthe-et-Moselle
- Arrondissement: Lunéville
- Canton: Lunéville-2
- Intercommunality: Territoire de Lunéville à Baccarat

Government
  - Mayor (2020–2026): Joël Donatin
- Area^{1}: 10.84 km^{2} (4.19 sq mi)
- Elevation: 234 m (768 ft)
- Highest elevation: 293 m (961 ft)
- Lowest elevation: 218 m (715 ft)
- Population (2023): 539
  - Density: 49.7/km^{2} (129/sq mi)
- Time zone: UTC+01:00 (CET)
  - Summer (DST): UTC+02:00 (CEST)
- INSEE/Postal code: 54595 /54300
- ^{1} French Land Register data, which excludes lakes, ponds, glaciers > 1 km^{2} (0.386 sq mi or 247 acres) and river estuaries.

Xermaménil (French pronunciation: [ɡzɛʁmamenil]) is a commune in the Meurthe-et-Moselle department in north-eastern France.

== Population ==
Historical population
Year	Pop.	±% p.a.
1968	283	—
1975	273	−0.51%
1982	305	+1.60%
1990	410	+3.77%
1999	423	+0.35%
2007	515	+2.49%
2012	559	+1.65%
2017	556	−0.11%
2023	539	−0.52%
Source: INSEE

== Geography ==
The river Mortagne forms all of the commune's western border.

== See also ==
- Communes of the Meurthe-et-Moselle department
