= Mortagne, Vosges =

Mortagne
- Commune
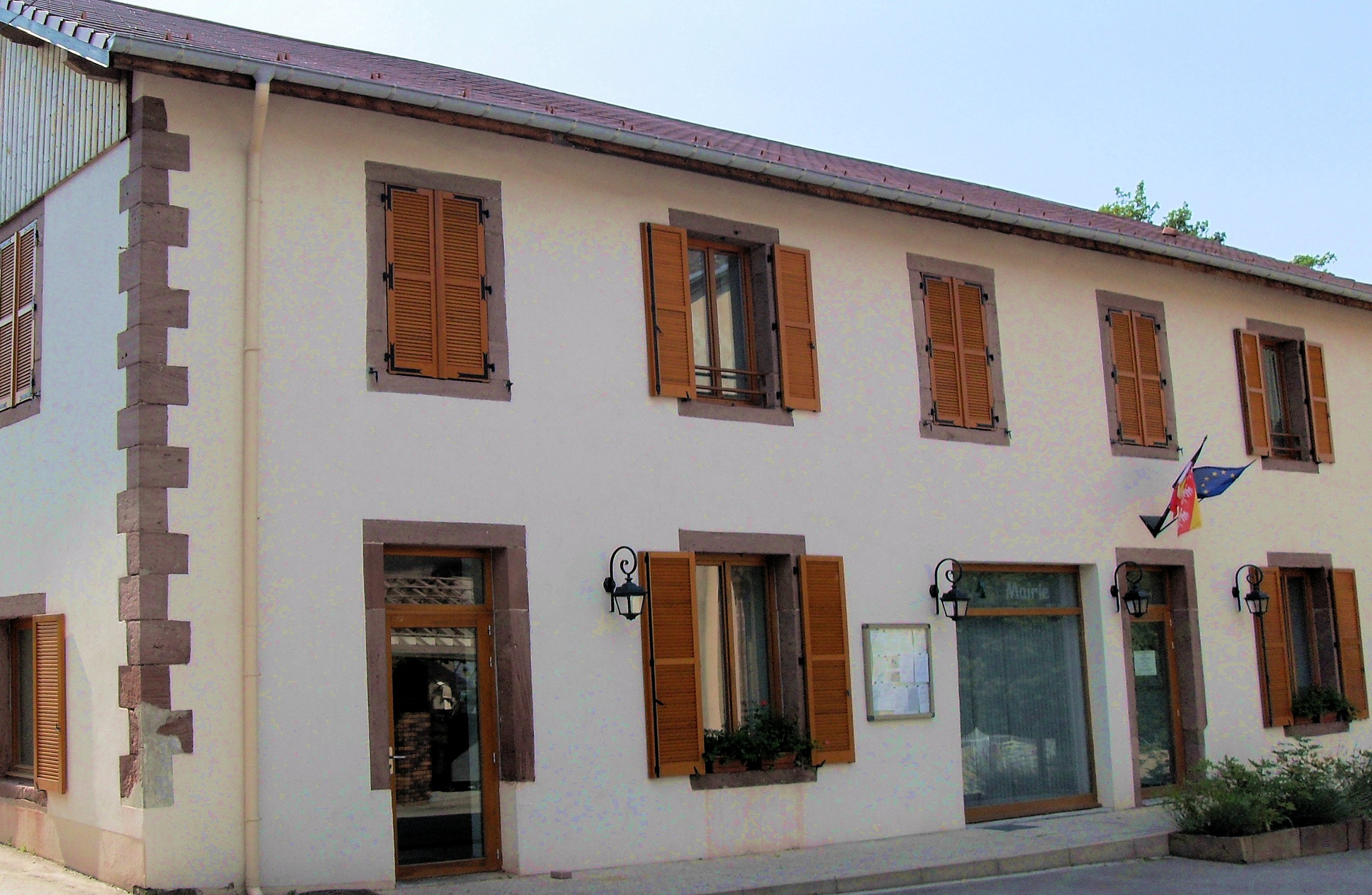
- The town hall in Mortagne
- Location of Mortagne
- Location within France Location within Grand Est
- Coordinates: 48°16′13″N 6°45′18″E
- Country: France
- Region: Grand Est
- Department: Vosges
- Arrondissement: Saint-Dié-des-Vosges
- Canton: Bruyères
- Intercommunality: CA Saint-Dié-des-Vosges

Government
  - Mayor (2020–2026): Lionel Leclerc
- Area^{1}: 22.2 km^{2} (8.6 sq mi)
- Elevation: 460 m (1,510 ft)
- Highest elevation: 654 m (2,146 ft)
- Lowest elevation: 341 m (1,119 ft)
- Population (2023): 196
  - Density: 8.83/km^{2} (22.9/sq mi)
- Time zone: UTC+01:00 (CET)
  - Summer (DST): UTC+02:00 (CEST)
- INSEE/Postal code: 88315 /88600
- ^{1} French Land Register data, which excludes lakes, ponds, glaciers > 1 km^{2} (0.386 sq mi or 247 acres) and river estuaries.

Mortagne (French pronunciation: [mɔʁtaɲ]) is a commune in the Vosges department in Grand Est in northeastern France.

It shares its name with the eponymous river which borders the commune on its south-eastern side.

== Geography ==
The commune is positioned on undulating lower slopes of the Vosges Mountains. The settlements in the commune are dispersed across various hamlets that include l'Orme, le Bout du Dessus, le Bout du Milieu and le Bout du Dessous. The commune is crossed by the little River Mossoux, a tributary of the Mortagne which itself feeds into the Meurthe. Much of the valley here remains wild and uncultivated: the last farm on the route to the forest is called 'The End of the World'.

== History ==
=== Etymology ===
The name of 'Mortagne' in the Vosges département is believed to come from the Celtic name of the river. Earlier spellings have included 'Mortesna', 'Mortennam', and a patois version, 'Moutone'.

For many years there was a widespread belief that the name was of Roman origin, related to the name 'Mauritania', being a reference to an encampment of a Moorish regiment during the closing centuries of the Roman Empire period: this belief is now discredited.

== See also ==
- Communes of the Vosges department
