= Vallois =

- Commune
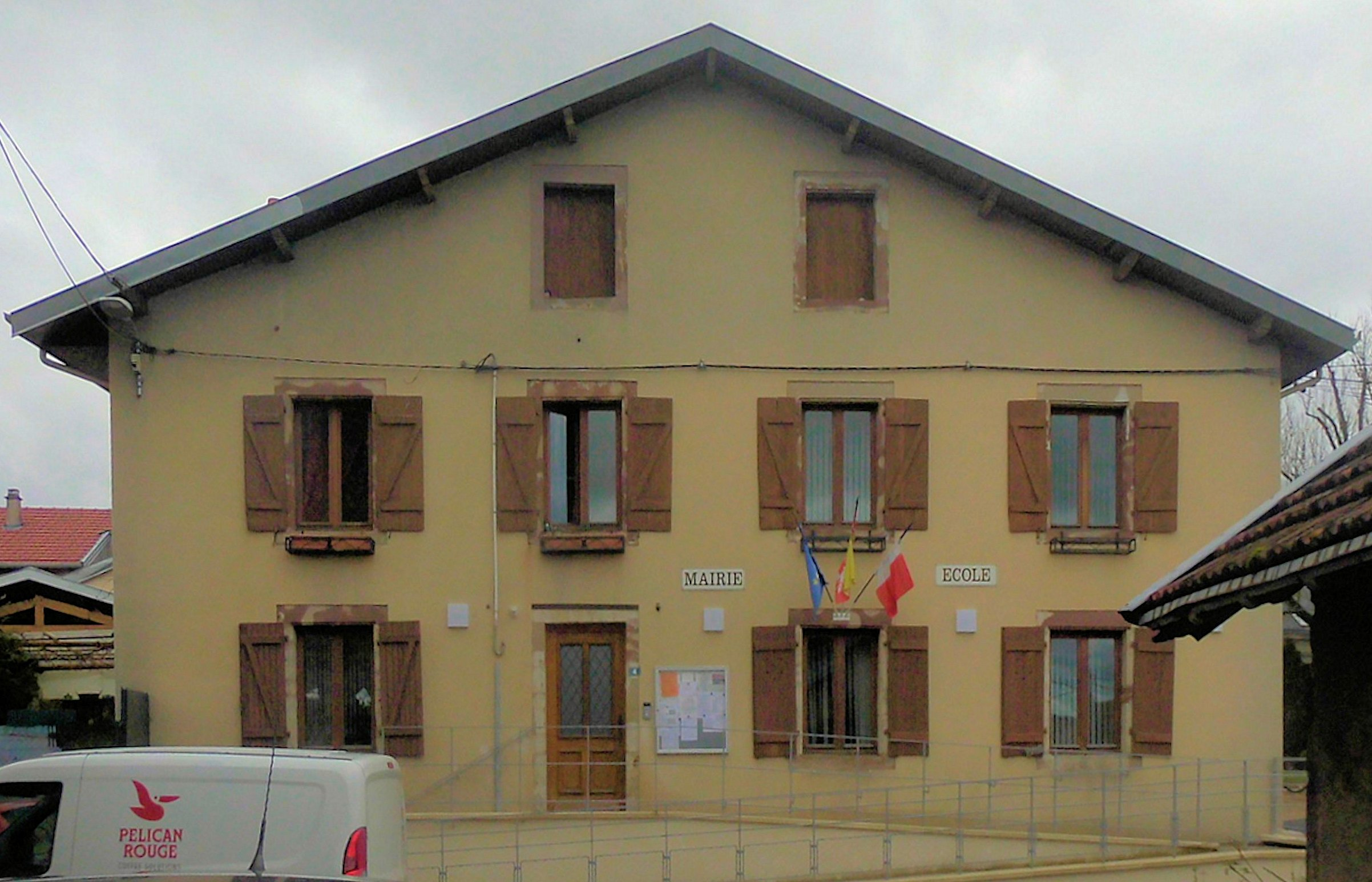
- The town hall and school in Vallois

- Coat of arms
- Location of Vallois
- Location within France Location within Grand Est
- Coordinates: 48°27′47″N 6°32′55″E
- Country: France
- Region: Grand Est
- Department: Meurthe-et-Moselle
- Arrondissement: Lunéville
- Canton: Lunéville-2
- Intercommunality: Territoire de Lunéville à Baccarat

Government
  - Mayor (2020–2026): Francine Mayer
- Area^{1}: 7.27 km^{2} (2.81 sq mi)
- Elevation: 244 m (801 ft)
- Highest elevation: 327 m (1,073 ft)
- Lowest elevation: 237 m (778 ft)
- Population (2023): 121
  - Density: 16.6/km^{2} (43.1/sq mi)
- Time zone: UTC+01:00 (CET)
  - Summer (DST): UTC+02:00 (CEST)
- INSEE/Postal code: 54543 /54830
- ^{1} French Land Register data, which excludes lakes, ponds, glaciers > 1 km^{2} (0.386 sq mi or 247 acres) and river estuaries.

Vallois (French pronunciation: [valwa]) is a commune in the Meurthe-et-Moselle department in north-eastern France.

== Geography ==
The river Mortagne forms most of the commune's north-eastern border.

== Demography ==
Historical population
Year	Pop.	±% p.a.
1968	111	—
1975	121	+1.24%
1982	110	−1.35%
1990	141	+3.15%
1999	144	+0.23%
2007	146	+0.17%
2012	143	−0.41%
2017	157	+1.89%
2023	121	−4.25%
Source: INSEE

== See also ==
- Communes of the Meurthe-et-Moselle department
