= Hôtel de Ville, Saint-Dié-des-Vosges =

Town hall in Saint-Dié-des-Vosges, France

Hôtel de Ville
- The main frontage of the Hôtel de Ville in May 2006

General information
- Type: City hall
- Architectural style: Modern style
- Location: Saint-Dié-des-Vosges, France
- Coordinates: 48.2874°N 6.9478°E
- Completed: c.1957

Design and construction
- Architect: Albert Debès

The Hôtel de Ville (French pronunciation: [otɛl də vil], City Hall) is a municipal building in Saint-Dié-des-Vosges, Vosges, in northeastern France, standing on Rue Stanislas.

== History ==
The old town hall

The first town hall was a medieval building in the town centre which was destroyed in a major fire in 1757. In the mid-1760s, the aldermen of Saint-Dié-des-Vosges decided to commission a new town hall. The site they selected was on the corner of Rue Thiers and Rue Stanislas. Construction of the new building started in 1766. It was designed by Jean-Michel Carbonnar in the neoclassical style, built in ashlar stone and was completed in 1769.

The design involved a symmetrical main frontage of 11 bays facing onto the street. The ground floor was rusticated and featured a series of round-headed openings with voussoirs and keystones forming an arcade. The building was fenestrated by casement windows with cornices on the first floor and by segmental-headed windows on the second floor. The central bay was flanked by banded pilasters supporting a round-headed pediment with a coat of arms, in the form of a Cross of Lorraine supported by two cherubs, in the tympanum. The Société Philomatique Vosgienne, dedicated to the advancement of sciences, occupied the whole of second floor from 1925.

As German troops withdrew from the town on 13 November 1944, during the Second World War, they used dynamite to destroy many of the buildings, including the old town hall and some 2,000 houses, as they implemented a scorched earth policy. The town was subsequently liberated by the American 103rd Infantry Division on 23 November 1944. The pediment from the old town hall was later recovered from the ruins and placed in Parc Jean-Mansuy.

After the war the council led by the mayor, Jean Mansuy, decided to clear the area on the east bank of the River Meuse and to create a new town centre. The site they selected for the new town hall was approximately 100 metres (330 feet) to the west of the old town hall. The new town hall was designed by Albert Debès in the modern style, built in concrete and glass and was completed in around 1957.

The design involved an asymmetrical main frontage of 16 bays facing onto the street. The main entrance was located about two-thirds of the was along the main frontage, occupied three bays and incorporated a semi-circular canopy. The first three bays and the last bay were faced in red brick on all three floors, while the other bays were faced with red brick on the ground floor and with plate glass on the upper two floors. Internally, the principal room was the Grand Salon on the first floor, which was accessed by a grand staircase. The justice of the peace court, the labour tribunal and the caretaker's flat were all placed on the second floor.

A statue depicting the former Prime Minister of France, Jules Ferry, which had been created by the sculptor, Antonin Mercié, and unveiled in the square in front of the cathedral in 1896, was relocated to a site to the immediate left of the new building in the late 1950s. A painting by the artist, Robert George, depicting personalities involved in the French Resistance, was installed in the Grand Salon in November 2014.
