= Mortagne (river) =

River in France

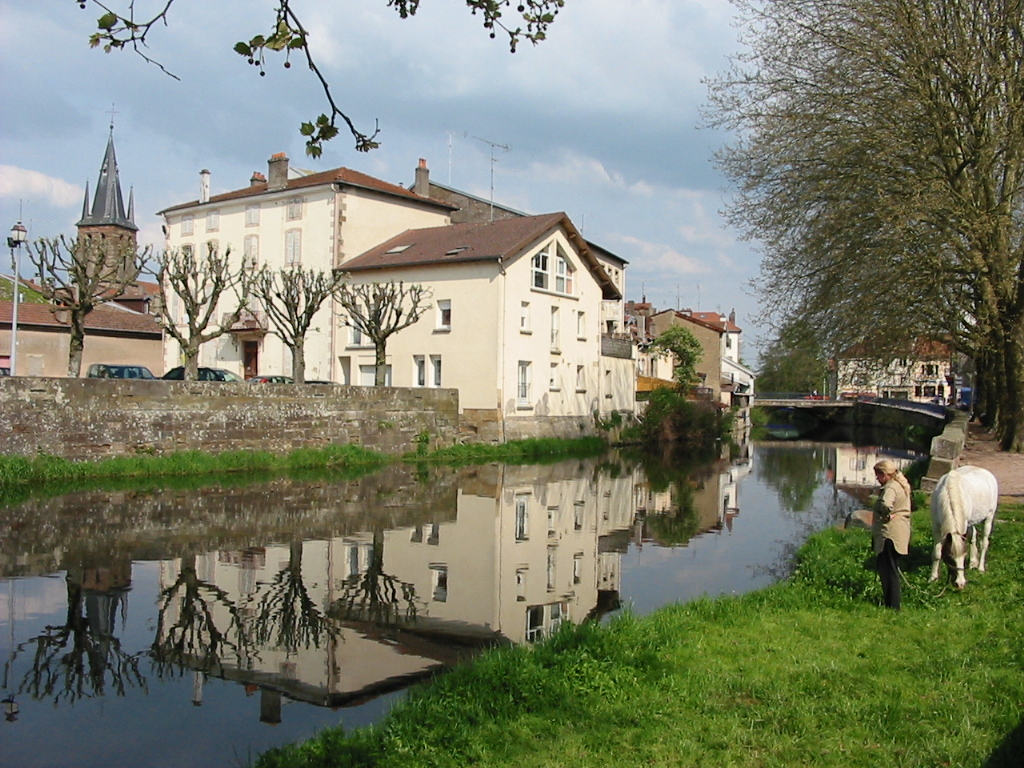
- The Mortagne at Rambervillers

- Location within France Location within Grand Est

Location
- Country: France
- Region: Grand Est

Physical characteristics
- Source
  - location: Saint-Léonard
  - coordinates: 48°12′49″N 06°52′23″E
  - elevation: 550 m (1,800 ft)
- Mouth
  - location: Meurthe
  - coordinates: 48°33′25″N 06°26′49″E
  - elevation: 215 m (705 ft)
- Length: 74.6 km (46.4 mi)
- Basin size: 582 km^{2} (225 sq mi)
- Discharge
  - average: 6.72 m^{3}/s (237 cu ft/s)

Basin features
- Progression: Meurthe→ Moselle→ Rhine→ North Sea

The Mortagne (French: la Mortagne) is a 74.6-kilometre (46.4 mi) long river in the Vosges and Meurthe-et-Moselle départements, northeastern France. Its source is at Saint-Léonard, 5 km (3.1 mi) west of the village, in the Vosges Mountains. It flows generally northwest. It is a left tributary of the Meurthe into which it flows at Mont-sur-Meurthe, 5 km (3.1 mi) southwest of Lunéville.

== Communes along its course ==
This list is ordered from source to mouth:

- Vosges: Saint-Léonard, Taintrux, La Houssière, Bois-de-Champ, Les Rouges-Eaux, Mortagne, Domfaing, Brouvelieures, Fremifontaine, Autrey, Sainte-Hélène, Saint-Gorgon, Jeanménil, Rambervillers, Roville-aux-Chênes, Saint-Maurice-sur-Mortagne, Xaffévillers, Deinvillers
- Meurthe-et-Moselle: Magnières, Vallois, Moyen, Gerbéviller, Haudonville, Lamath, Xermaménil, Mont-sur-Meurthe
