= Magnières =

- Commune
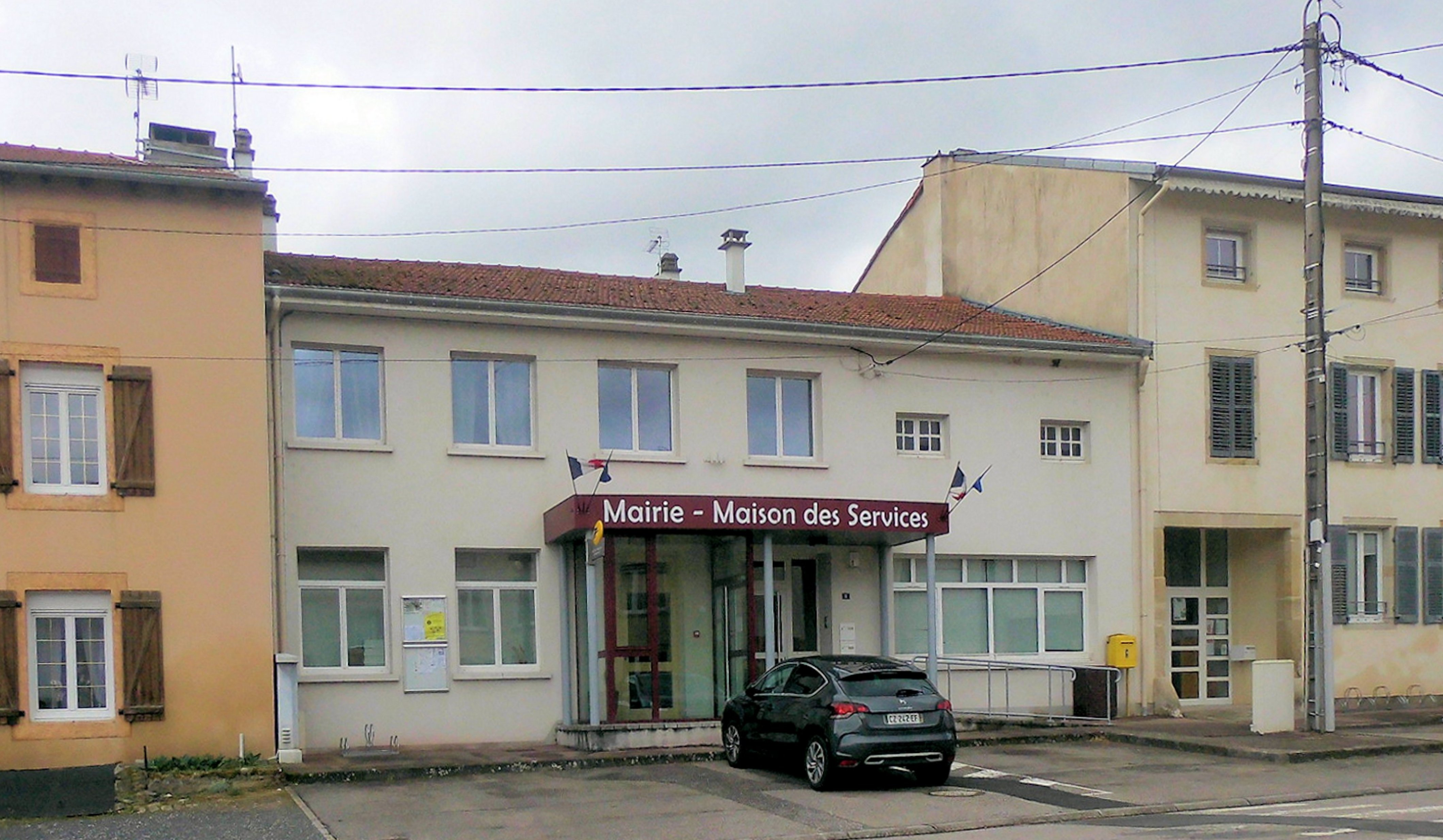
- The town hall and post office in Magnières

- Coat of arms
- Location of Magnières
- Location within France Location within Grand Est
- Coordinates: 48°26′46″N 6°33′59″E
- Country: France
- Region: Grand Est
- Department: Meurthe-et-Moselle
- Arrondissement: Lunéville
- Canton: Lunéville-2
- Intercommunality: Territoire de Lunéville à Baccarat

Government
  - Mayor (2020–2026): Édouard Babel
- Area^{1}: 11.58 km^{2} (4.47 sq mi)
- Elevation: 250 m (820 ft)
- Highest elevation: 334 m (1,096 ft)
- Lowest elevation: 242 m (794 ft)
- Population (2023): 290
  - Density: 25/km^{2} (65/sq mi)
- Time zone: UTC+01:00 (CET)
  - Summer (DST): UTC+02:00 (CEST)
- INSEE/Postal code: 54331 /54129
- ^{1} French Land Register data, which excludes lakes, ponds, glaciers > 1 km^{2} (0.386 sq mi or 247 acres) and river estuaries.

Magnières (French pronunciation: [maɲɛʁ]) is a commune in the Meurthe-et-Moselle department in north-eastern France.

== Geography ==
The village lies in the middle of the commune, on the right bank of the river Mortagne, which flows northward through the commune.

== See also ==
- Communes of the Meurthe-et-Moselle department
