= Lamath =

- Commune
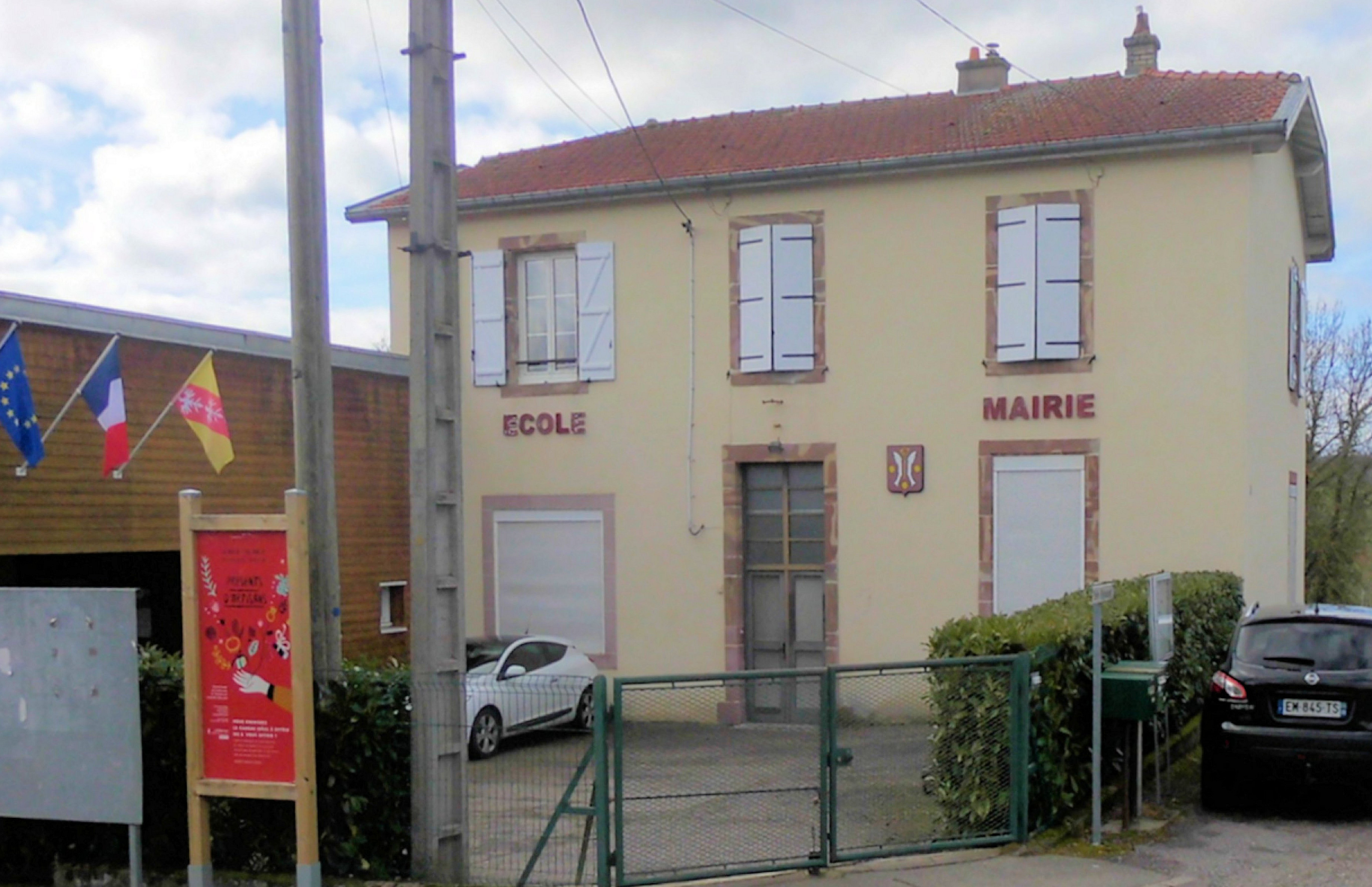
- The town hall and school in Lamath

- Coat of arms
- Location of Lamath
- Location within France Location within Grand Est
- Coordinates: 48°31′50″N 6°27′01″E
- Country: France
- Region: Grand Est
- Department: Meurthe-et-Moselle
- Arrondissement: Lunéville
- Canton: Lunéville-2
- Intercommunality: Territoire de Lunéville à Baccarat

Government
  - Mayor (2020–2026): Bernard Genay
- Area^{1}: 5.6 km^{2} (2.2 sq mi)
- Elevation: 224 m (735 ft)
- Highest elevation: 280 m (920 ft)
- Lowest elevation: 220 m (720 ft)
- Population (2023): 180
  - Density: 32/km^{2} (83/sq mi)
- Time zone: UTC+01:00 (CET)
  - Summer (DST): UTC+02:00 (CEST)
- INSEE/Postal code: 54292 /54300
- ^{1} French Land Register data, which excludes lakes, ponds, glaciers > 1 km^{2} (0.386 sq mi or 247 acres) and river estuaries.

Lamath (French pronunciation: [lamat]) is a commune in the Meurthe-et-Moselle department in north-eastern France.

== Geography ==
The village lies in the northern part of the commune, on the left bank of the river Mortagne, which forms most of the commune's north-eastern border.

== See also ==
- Communes of the Meurthe-et-Moselle department
