= Domfaing =

- Commune
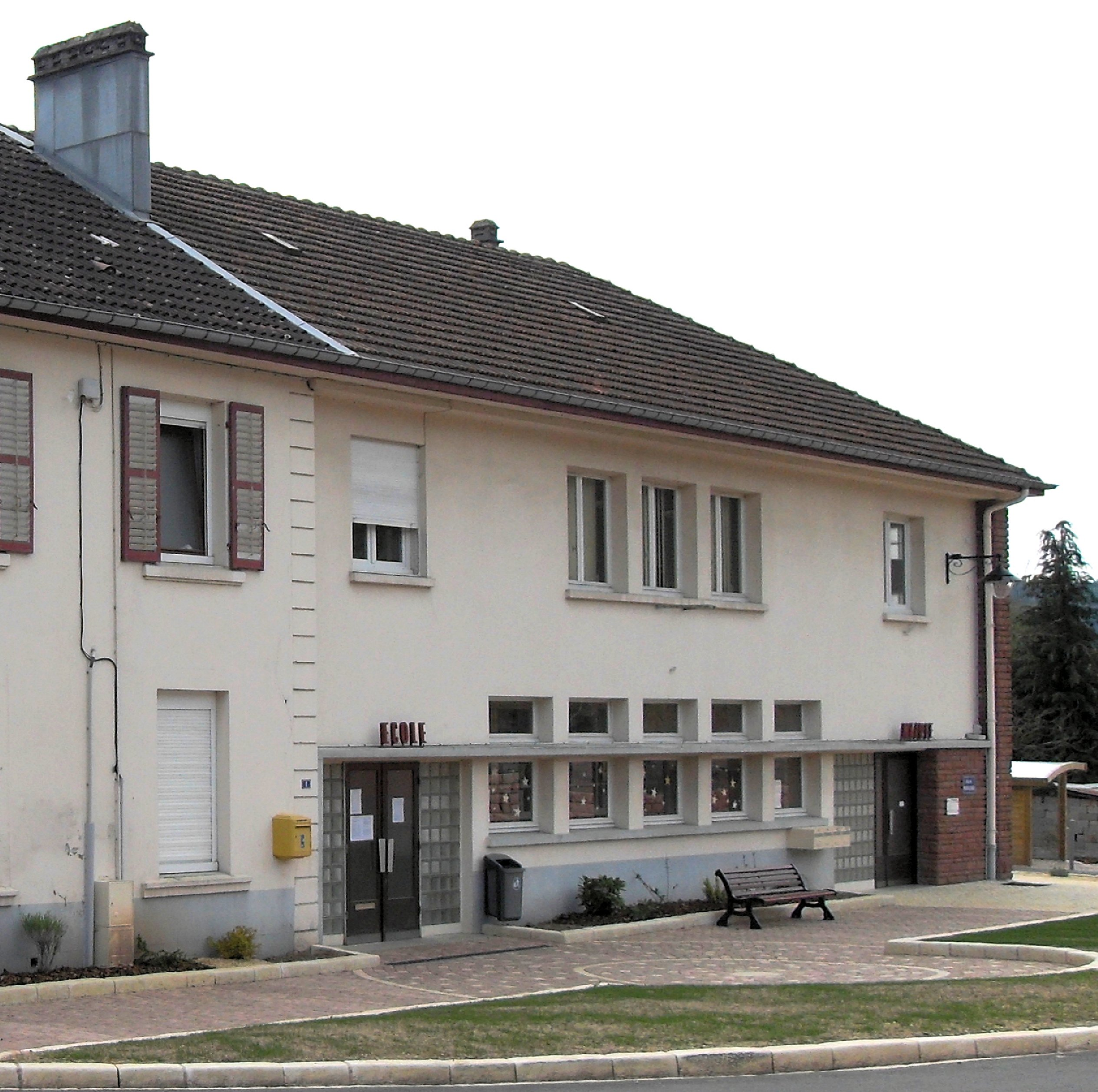
- The town hall and school in Domfaing
- Location of Domfaing
- Location within France Location within Grand Est
- Coordinates: 48°14′08″N 6°44′57″E
- Country: France
- Region: Grand Est
- Department: Vosges
- Arrondissement: Saint-Dié-des-Vosges
- Canton: Bruyères
- Intercommunality: CC Bruyères - Vallons des Vosges

Government
  - Mayor (2020–2026): Alain Charles
- Area^{1}: 3.9 km^{2} (1.5 sq mi)
- Elevation: 370 m (1,210 ft)
- Highest elevation: 507 m (1,663 ft)
- Lowest elevation: 361 m (1,184 ft)
- Population (2023): 210
  - Density: 54/km^{2} (140/sq mi)
- Time zone: UTC+01:00 (CET)
  - Summer (DST): UTC+02:00 (CEST)
- INSEE/Postal code: 88145 /88600
- ^{1} French Land Register data, which excludes lakes, ponds, glaciers > 1 km^{2} (0.386 sq mi or 247 acres) and river estuaries.

Domfaing (French pronunciation: [dɔ̃fɛ̃]) is a commune in the Vosges department in Grand Est in northeastern France.

== Geography ==
The river Mortagne forms part of the commune's northern border.

== See also ==
- Communes of the Vosges department
