= Brouvelieures =

- Commune
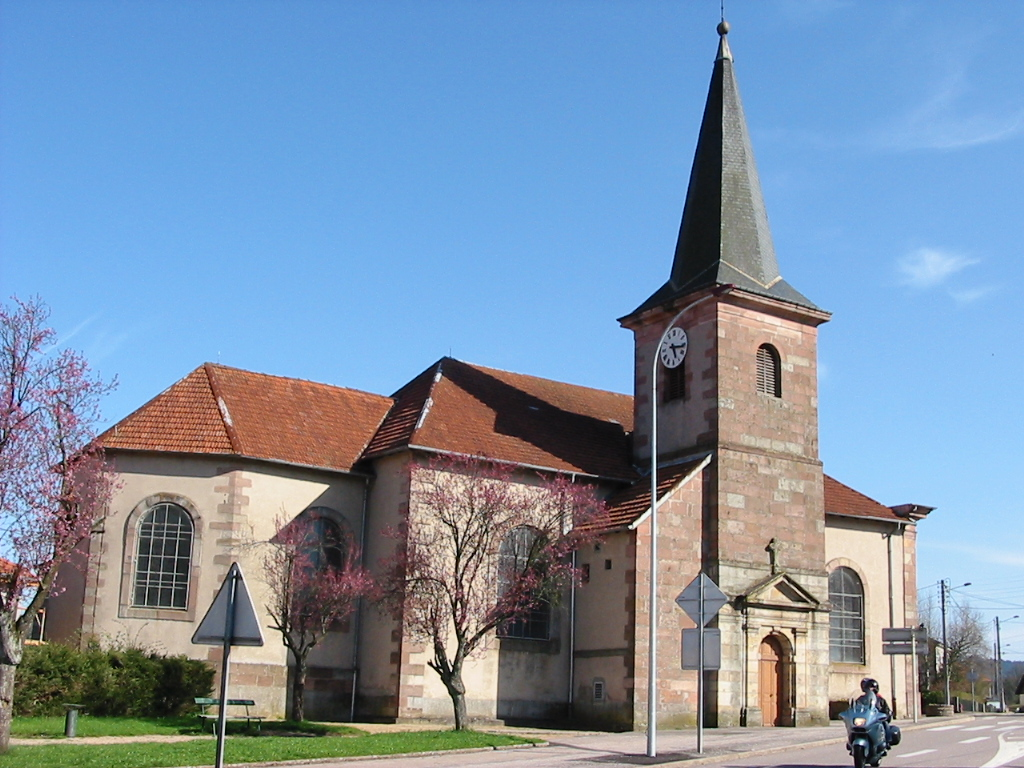
- Sainte-Croix

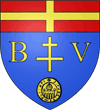
- Flag Coat of arms
- Location of Brouvelieures
- Location within France Location within Grand Est
- Coordinates: 48°14′17″N 6°43′59″E
- Country: France
- Region: Grand Est
- Department: Vosges
- Arrondissement: Saint-Dié-des-Vosges
- Canton: Bruyères
- Intercommunality: CC Bruyères - Vallons des Vosges

Government
  - Mayor (2020–2026): Anne-Marie de Sousa
- Area^{1}: 7.36 km^{2} (2.84 sq mi)
- Elevation: 392 m (1,286 ft)
- Highest elevation: 545 m (1,788 ft)
- Lowest elevation: 347 m (1,138 ft)
- Population (2023): 405
  - Density: 55.0/km^{2} (143/sq mi)
- Time zone: UTC+01:00 (CET)
  - Summer (DST): UTC+02:00 (CEST)
- INSEE/Postal code: 88076 /88600
- ^{1} French Land Register data, which excludes lakes, ponds, glaciers > 1 km^{2} (0.386 sq mi or 247 acres) and river estuaries.

Brouvelieures (French pronunciation: [bʁuvəljœʁ]) is a commune in the Vosges department in Grand Est in northeastern France.

== Geography ==
The village lies in the middle of the commune, 20 km (12 mi) northeast of Épinal.

The river Mortagne flows northwestward through the northern part of the commune.

== See also ==
- Communes of the Vosges department
