= Bois-de-Champ =

- Commune
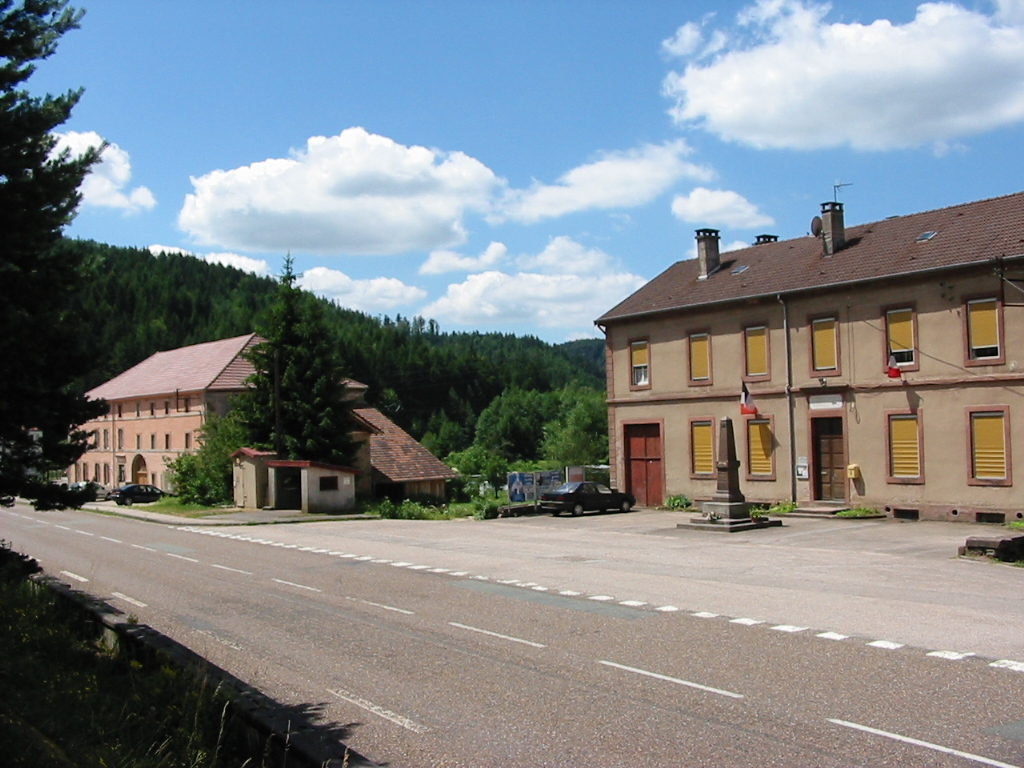
- Town hall

- Coat of arms
- Location of Bois-de-Champ
- Location within France Location within Grand Est
- Coordinates: 48°15′20″N 6°47′28″E
- Country: France
- Region: Grand Est
- Department: Vosges
- Arrondissement: Saint-Dié-des-Vosges
- Canton: Bruyères
- Intercommunality: CA Saint-Dié-des-Vosges

Government
  - Mayor (2020–2026): Jacques Caverzasi
- Area^{1}: 17.69 km^{2} (6.83 sq mi)
- Elevation: 450 m (1,480 ft)
- Highest elevation: 633 m (2,077 ft)
- Lowest elevation: 375 m (1,230 ft)
- Population (2023): 105
  - Density: 5.94/km^{2} (15.4/sq mi)
- Time zone: UTC+01:00 (CET)
  - Summer (DST): UTC+02:00 (CEST)
- INSEE/Postal code: 88064 /88600
- ^{1} French Land Register data, which excludes lakes, ponds, glaciers > 1 km^{2} (0.386 sq mi or 247 acres) and river estuaries.

Bois-de-Champ (French pronunciation: [bwa də ʃɑ̃]) is a commune in the Vosges department in Grand Est in northeastern France.

== Geography ==
The river Mortagne forms all of the commune's northern border.

== See also ==
- Communes of the Vosges department
