= Les Rouges-Eaux =

- Commune
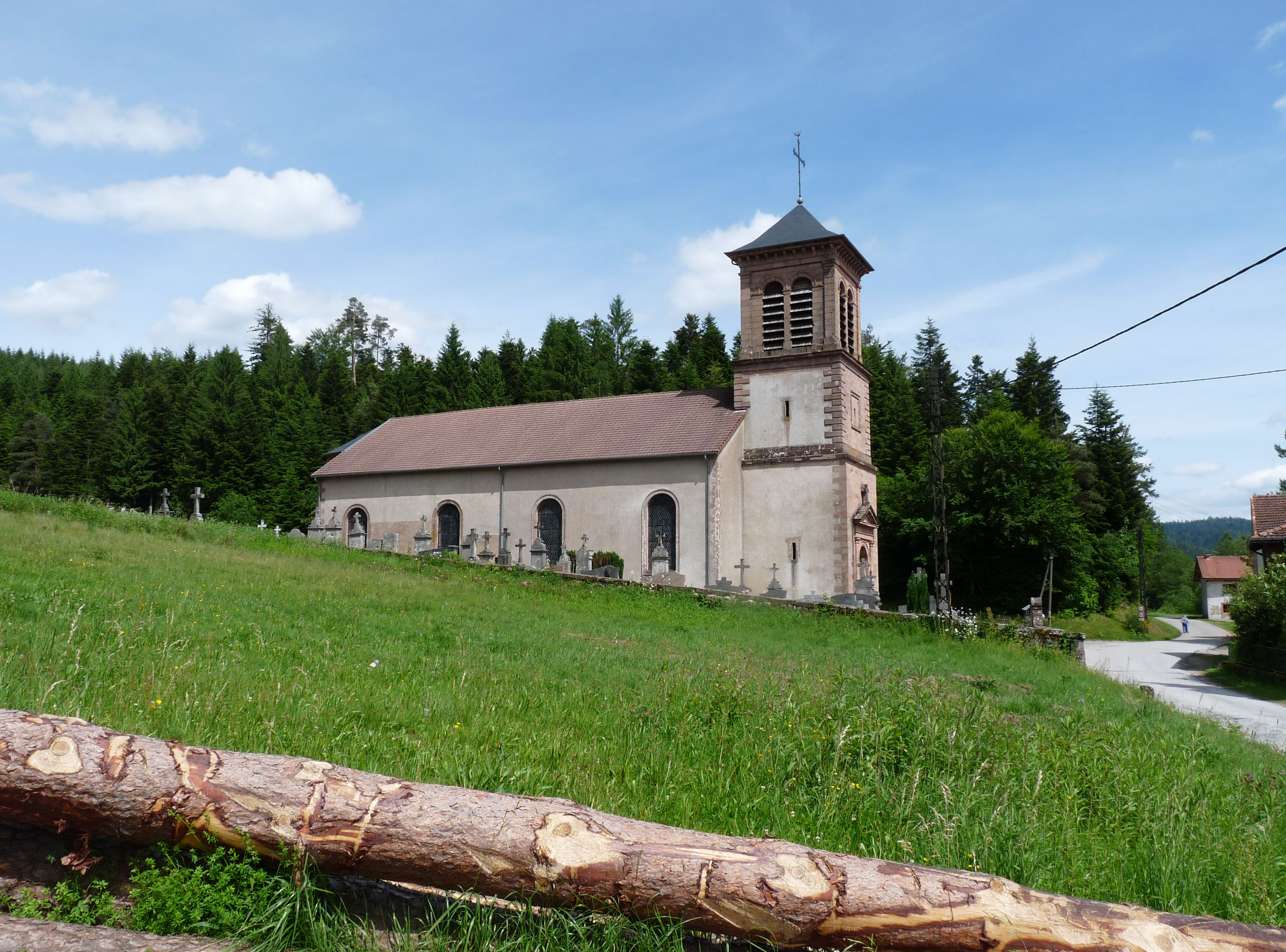
- Saint Jean Baptiste
- Location of Les Rouges-Eaux
- Location within France Location within Grand Est
- Coordinates: 48°15′49″N 6°48′09″E
- Country: France
- Region: Grand Est
- Department: Vosges
- Arrondissement: Saint-Dié-des-Vosges
- Canton: Bruyères
- Intercommunality: CA Saint-Dié-des-Vosges

Government
  - Mayor (2020–2026): Bernadette Rivat
- Area^{1}: 5.9 km^{2} (2.3 sq mi)
- Elevation: 400 m (1,300 ft)
- Highest elevation: 620 m (2,030 ft)
- Lowest elevation: 377 m (1,237 ft)
- Population (2023): 80
  - Density: 14/km^{2} (35/sq mi)
- Time zone: UTC+01:00 (CET)
  - Summer (DST): UTC+02:00 (CEST)
- INSEE/Postal code: 88398 /88600
- ^{1} French Land Register data, which excludes lakes, ponds, glaciers > 1 km^{2} (0.386 sq mi or 247 acres) and river estuaries.

Les Rouges-Eaux (French pronunciation: [le ʁuʒ.z‿o], literally The Red Waters) is a commune in the Vosges department in Grand Est in northeastern France.

== Geography ==
The river Mortagne forms part of the commune's southern border.

== See also ==
- Communes of the Vosges department
