= Fremifontaine =

- Commune
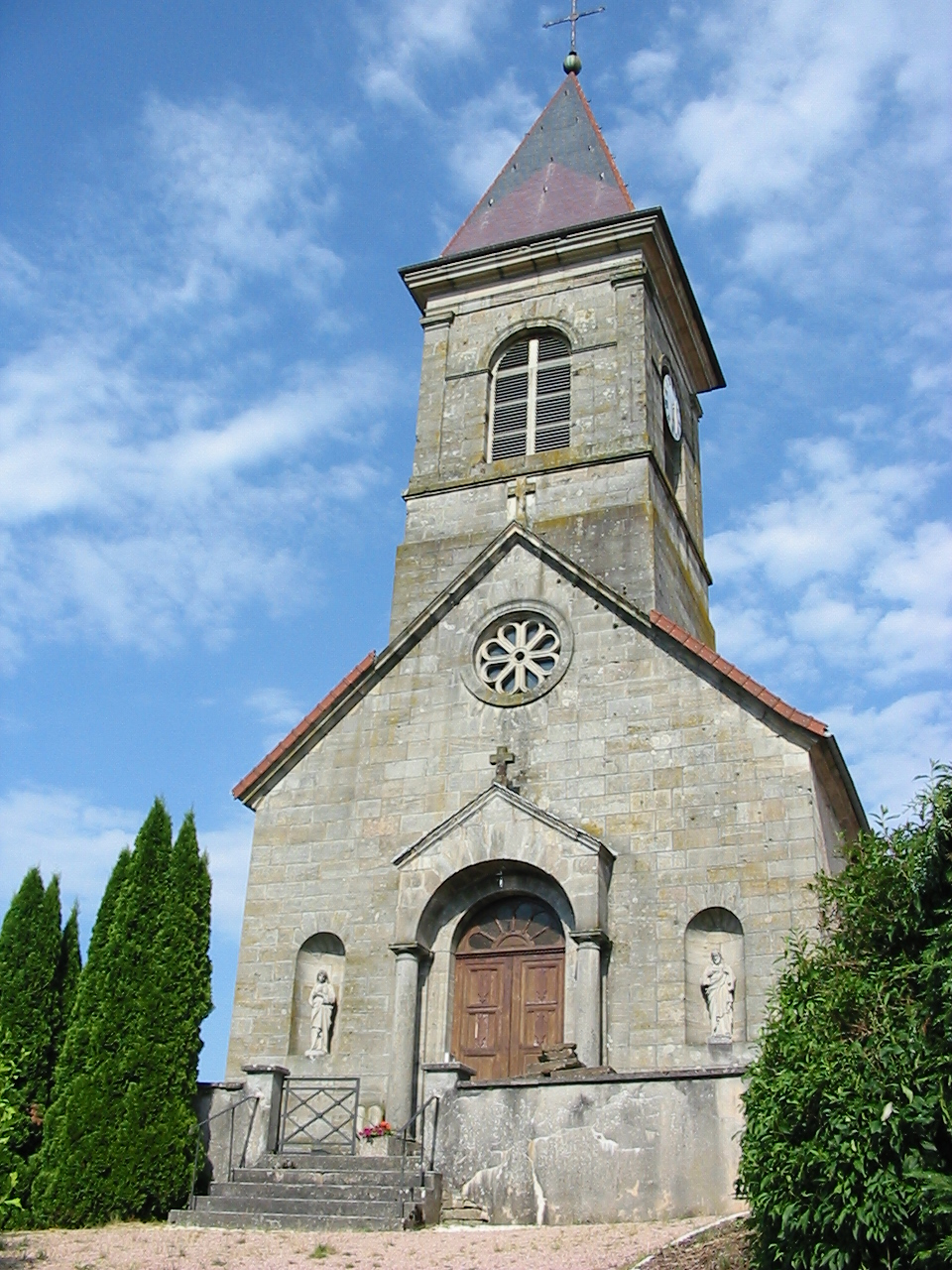
- The church in Fremifontaine

- Coat of arms
- Location of Fremifontaine
- Location within France Location within Grand Est
- Coordinates: 48°16′16″N 6°41′08″E
- Country: France
- Region: Grand Est
- Department: Vosges
- Arrondissement: Saint-Dié-des-Vosges
- Canton: Bruyères
- Intercommunality: CC Bruyères - Vallons des Vosges

Government
  - Mayor (2020–2026): Guy Delaite
- Area^{1}: 9.56 km^{2} (3.69 sq mi)
- Elevation: 339 m (1,112 ft)
- Highest elevation: 469 m (1,539 ft)
- Lowest elevation: 329 m (1,079 ft)
- Population (2023): 428
  - Density: 44.8/km^{2} (116/sq mi)
- Time zone: UTC+01:00 (CET)
  - Summer (DST): UTC+02:00 (CEST)
- INSEE/Postal code: 88184 /88600
- ^{1} French Land Register data, which excludes lakes, ponds, glaciers > 1 km^{2} (0.386 sq mi or 247 acres) and river estuaries.

Fremifontaine (French pronunciation: [fʁemifɔ̃tɛn]) is a commune in the Vosges department in Grand Est in northeastern France.

== Geography ==
The river Mortagne forms all of the commune's northeastern border.

== See also ==
- Communes of the Vosges department
