= Saint-Dié-des-Vosges =

- Subprefecture and commune
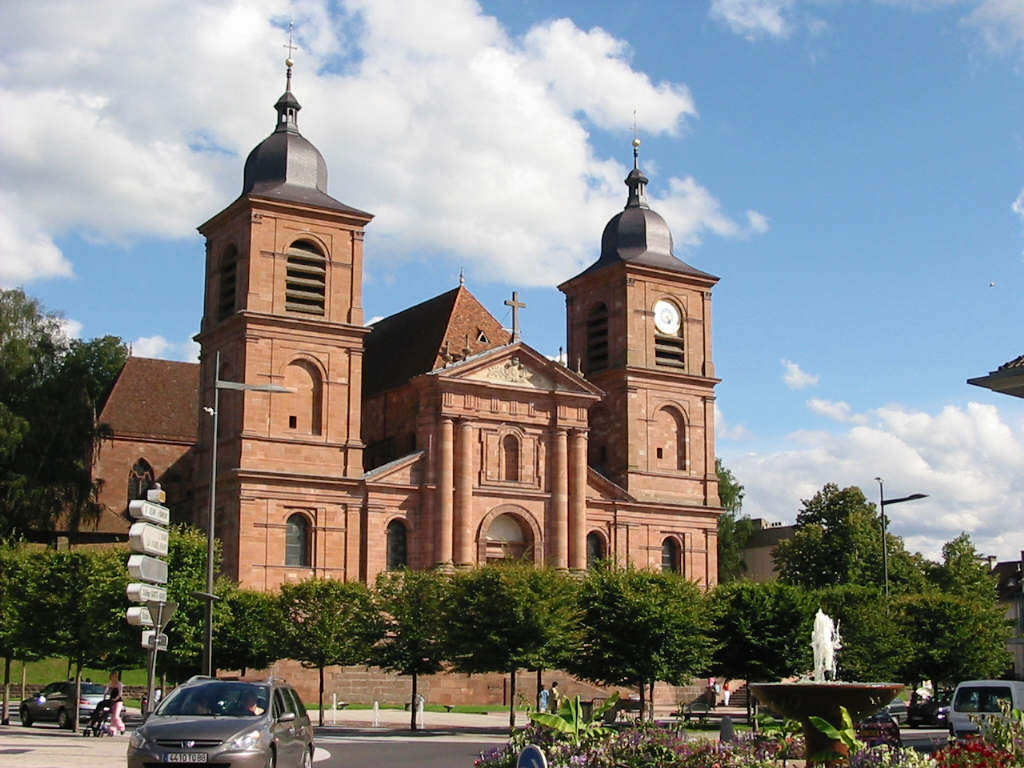
- Cathedral

- Coat of arms
- Location of Saint-Dié-des-Vosges
- Location within France Location within Grand Est
- Coordinates: 48°17′N 6°57′E
- Country: France
- Region: Grand Est
- Department: Vosges
- Arrondissement: Saint-Dié-des-Vosges
- Canton: Saint-Dié-des-Vosges-1 and 2
- Intercommunality: CA Saint-Dié-des-Vosges

Government
  - Mayor (2022–2026): Bruno Toussaint
- Area^{1}: 46.15 km^{2} (17.82 sq mi)
- Elevation: 343 m (1,125 ft)
- Highest elevation: 901 m (2,956 ft)
- Lowest elevation: 310 m (1,020 ft)
- Population (2023): 19,251
  - Density: 417.1/km^{2} (1,080/sq mi)
- Time zone: UTC+01:00 (CET)
  - Summer (DST): UTC+02:00 (CEST)
- INSEE/Postal code: 88413 /88100
- Website: https://www.saint-die-des-vosges.fr/
- ^{1} French Land Register data, which excludes lakes, ponds, glaciers > 1 km^{2} (0.386 sq mi or 247 acres) and river estuaries.

Saint-Dié-des-Vosges (French pronunciation: [sɛ̃ dje de voʒ]; German: Sankt Didel, before 1999: Saint-Dié) is a commune in the Vosges department, Grand Est, northeastern France.

It is a sub-prefecture of the department.

== Geography ==
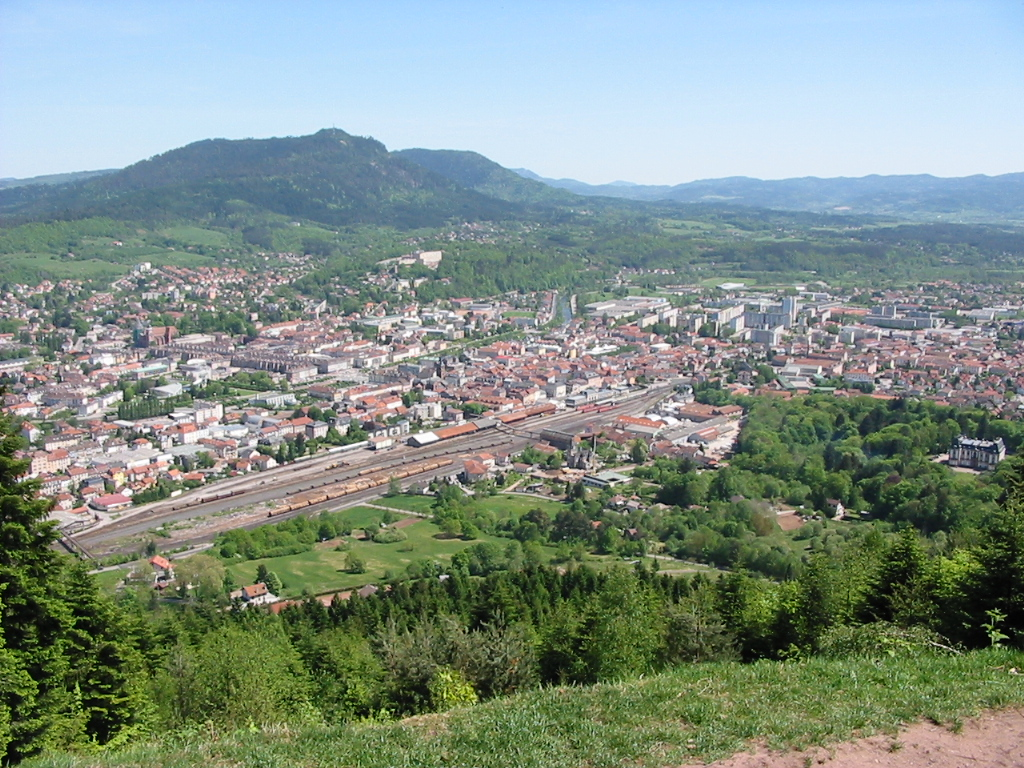
The city located in the Vosges mountains.

Saint-Dié is located in the Vosges Mountains 80 km (50 mi) southeast of Nancy and 80 km (50 mi) southwest of Strasbourg. This route in the valley of the river Meurthe was always the more frequented, and first to get a rail line in 1864, so now it accommodates the primary road.

Saint-Dié-des-Vosges, principal town of an arrondissement of the same name, belongs to the Vosges département of France. This commune with a little town in her center, is approximately 50 km (31 mi) northeast of Épinal, and connected by two roads, south through the passes of Haut-Jacques and Bruyères or north by the pass of Haut-du-Bois and the ancient land of Rambervillers. By rail, Épinal is 61 km (38 mi) from Saint-Dié. The Saint-Dié-des-Vosges station offers rail connections to Épinal, Strasbourg, Nancy and Paris.

The river Meurthe flows in the Permian basin of Saint-Dié surrounded by wooded mountains Ormont, Kemberg and La Madeleine. The peaks of these mountains are 550 metres (1,800 feet) high, and are composed of Triassic formations, especially the so-called "Vosges sandstone", a kind of red sandstone.

== Features ==
The Hôtel de Ville

The town was nearly completely redesigned and rebuilt in the French Uniform Style after the fire of 1757. A major part was destroyed in November 1944 and was rebuilt largely in a material imitating red sandstone. Its cathedral has a Gothic nave and choir designed in the 14th century; the portal of red stone was created by Giovanni Betto in the beginning of the 18th century. A cloister, begun in the 14th century but never finished, contains a stone pulpit, and connects with the Petite-Eglise or Notre-Dame-de-Galilée, a well-preserved specimen of Romanesque architecture of the 12th century. All of the monuments were restored or rebuilt in the same manner after 1950.

Since 1880, the council has owned a marvelous theatre, a library with some old and valuable manuscripts, a reading hall and a museum of rocks and antiquities collected by the members of the Vosges Philomatic Society. This society, which engaged in the collection and diffusion of knowledge, was founded in 1875 by Henry Bardy, who was soon an editor of the first local republican paper named La Gazette Vosgiennne. All this center of town was destroyed in November 1944.

A new Hôtel de Ville was built 100 metres (330 feet) to the west and completed around 1957. At its west side there is now a monument by Antonin Mercié to Jules Ferry, previously located in the square in front of the cathedral. Born in the town in 1832, Jules Ferry was a great French politician of the conservative Republic, constitutionally called Third Republic in 1875.

After World War II, the right side of the Meurthe was completely razed and most people lived outside the town in wood cabins for decades. The radical plan created by Le Corbusier in 1945, which called for a large plaza with factories and other buildings in the heart of the city, was rejected in 1947, and only one private factory belonging to Jean-Jacques Duval was ever built. There were no means nor materials in this terrible period and the great street called "rue Thiers" was finished only at the end of 1954.

== Economy ==
The town was industrial in nature long before the local economy reaped the benefits from a migration of Alsatians, who arrived after the Franco-Prussian War of 1870–1871. Its industries included the spinning, weaving and bleaching of cotton, wire-drawing, metal-founding, the manufacture of hosiery, woodwork of various kinds (toleware), machinery, iron goods and wire screen. Since the world wars, major industrial activities have declined precipitously. Now the town is primarily a center of public services, educational institutions, a hospital, and businesses in the service industries, such as supermarkets.

== History ==
Saint-Dié (Lat. Deodatum, Theodata, S. Deodati Fanum) is named for Saint Deodat. A holy man who was known as "le bonhomme", he founded a ban (a political and Christian subdivision of the royal territory) in the 7th century that was originally called Foresta. Some religious historians believed he was the bishop of Nevers, Deodatus of Nevers. Deodatus gave up his official functions to retire to a desert dwelling. Other sources connect the name, however, with an earlier saint, Deodatus of Blois (d. 525).

Archeological and historical records confirm the total time that this area has been inhabited. One hypothesis holds that a column constructed by Romans on a site originally dedicated to Tiwaz – Tius, god of war – might explain ancient ceremonies in the old Saint-Dié chapel at the foot of Kemberg mountain (locally called Saint-Martin). Deodatus, who could have been an episcopus hiberniensis (bishop from Ireland) or an episcopus niverniensis (bishop from Nevers), would have lived in an old monastery or vieux moutier above the old chapel and a water source.

Legends originating in the 11th century as well as popular traditions say that Saint Deodatus himself dreamed of a new monastery to be built upon a little hill called la monticule des Jointures, visible on the other side of the river. A little monastic community dedicated to Saint Maurice was probably founded during Carolingian times, as there is evidence of its presence there since the 10th century. After 1006, the monastery took the name Saint-Dié. The little monastery was partially destroyed by fire in 1065 and again in 1155.

The date on which the site became a chapter of canons is uncertain. Historians deny that Brunon de Dabo-Egisheim, future Pope Leo IX, was a young monk and great provost here, but his family did play a great role in the elevated status of this religious place, giving their coat of arms to it after the First Crusades. Canons who subsequently held the rank of provost or dean came from very rich and noble families, among them Giovanni de Medici and several princes of the ducal House of Lorraine. Among the extensive privileges enjoyed by them was the coining of money; the Duchy of Lorraine was the last to hold this privilege, in 1601.

Though they co-operated in building the town walls in 1290, the canons and the dukes of Lorraine soon became rivals for the authority over Saint-Dié. The institution of a town council in 1628 which appropriated part of their temporal jurisdiction, in addition to numerous French occupations, diminished the financial influence of the canons. During the Stanislas reign and after the Lorraine annexation in 1776, the establishment in 1777 of a bishopric condemned the venerable institution, with the first bishop Monseigneur de Chaumont. With the French Revolution all the religious people were completely swept away.

The town was repeatedly sacked during the wars of the 15th, 16th and 17th centuries. The little but religiously very prestigious town was partially destroyed by fire in 1554 and 1757. Funds for the rebuilding of the portion of the town destroyed by the last fire were supplied by Stanislas, last duke of Lorraine.

The Musée Pierre-Noël was built in 1977 and originally showcased life in the High Vosges, but the collections now also prominently feature contemporary art.

== Ecclesiastical history ==
The diocese of Saint-Dié was created in 1777, but suppressed by the Concordat of 1801. It was restored in 1822 as a suffragan of the Diocese of Besançon covering the department of the Vosges, of which 18 parishes were transferred to the Diocese of Strasbourg in 1871.

The diocese of Saint-Dié originated in the celebrated abbey, initially named "Galilée", and was established by Saint Deodatus (Dié) in the 7th century, around which the town of Saint-Dié grew up. The Benedictines of the original foundation Saint Maurice were replaced in 996 by Augustinian Canons.

During the sixteenth century, and the long vacancy of the see of Toul, the abbots of the several monasteries in the Vosges, without actually declaring themselves independent of the diocese of Toul, claimed to exercise a quasi-episcopal jurisdiction. In 1718, the Bishop of Toul requested the creation of a see at Saint-Dié, but the suggestion was opposed by the King of France. The see was eventually created by Pope Pius VI in 1777 by the elevation of the abbey of Saint-Dié into a bishopric. The new diocese was removed from the diocese of Toul and made instead a suffragan of the German Archdiocese of Trier.

The Reformed Church building in Saint-Dié contains six stained windows, depicting the first six days of Creation, designed by the Swiss artist Annie Vallotton, whose brother was the minister there.

== Population ==
Historical population
Year	Pop.	±% p.a.
1968	25,117	—
1975	25,423	+0.17%
1982	23,759	−0.96%
1990	22,635	−0.60%
1999	22,569	−0.03%
2007	21,882	−0.39%
2012	21,053	−0.77%
2017	19,607	−1.41%
2023	19,251	−0.30%
Source: INSEE

== Cosmography ==
Vautrin Lud, Canon of St-Dié in charge of the mines of the valleys was the chaplain and secretary of René II, Duke of Lorraine. He set up a printing-establishment at St-Dié and facilitated reflections on the theme of Earth representation and also met with what would today be called geographers, the German cartographer Martin Waldseemüller, and the Alsatian professor Matthias Ringmann and clever Canons.

The team began at once to produce an edition of a Latin translation of Ptolemy's "Geography". In 1507, René II received the Soderini Letter from Lisbon, an abridged account of the four voyages of Amerigo Vespucci. Canon Lud had this translated into Latin by Basin de Sandaucourt. The translation dedicated to the Emperor Maximilian was completed at St-Dié on 24 April 1507; it was prefaced by a short explanatory booklet, entitled Cosmographiae Introductio, certainly the work of Waldseemüller, an introduction to cosmography that can be seen as the baptismal certificate of the New Continent. Indeed, Waldseemüller and the scholars of the Gymnasium Vosagense then made a capital decision writing: "...And since Europe and Asia received names of women, I do not see any reason not to call this latest discovery Amerige, or America, according to the sagacious man who discovered it".

The first and second printings appeared in August 1507 at St-Dié, a third at Strassburg in 1509, and thus the name of America was spread about. Thus, Saint-Dié-des-Vosges is honored today with the title of "godmother of America", the city that named America. The work was re-edited with an English version by Charles Herbermann (New York, 1907). Gallois proved that in 1507, Waldseemüller inserted this name in two maps, but that in 1513, in other maps Waldseemüller, being better informed, inserted the name of Columbus as the discoverer of America. But it was too late; the name of America had been already firmly established.

In 1507, Martin Waldseemüller produced in St-Dié also a world globe bearing the first use of the name "America".

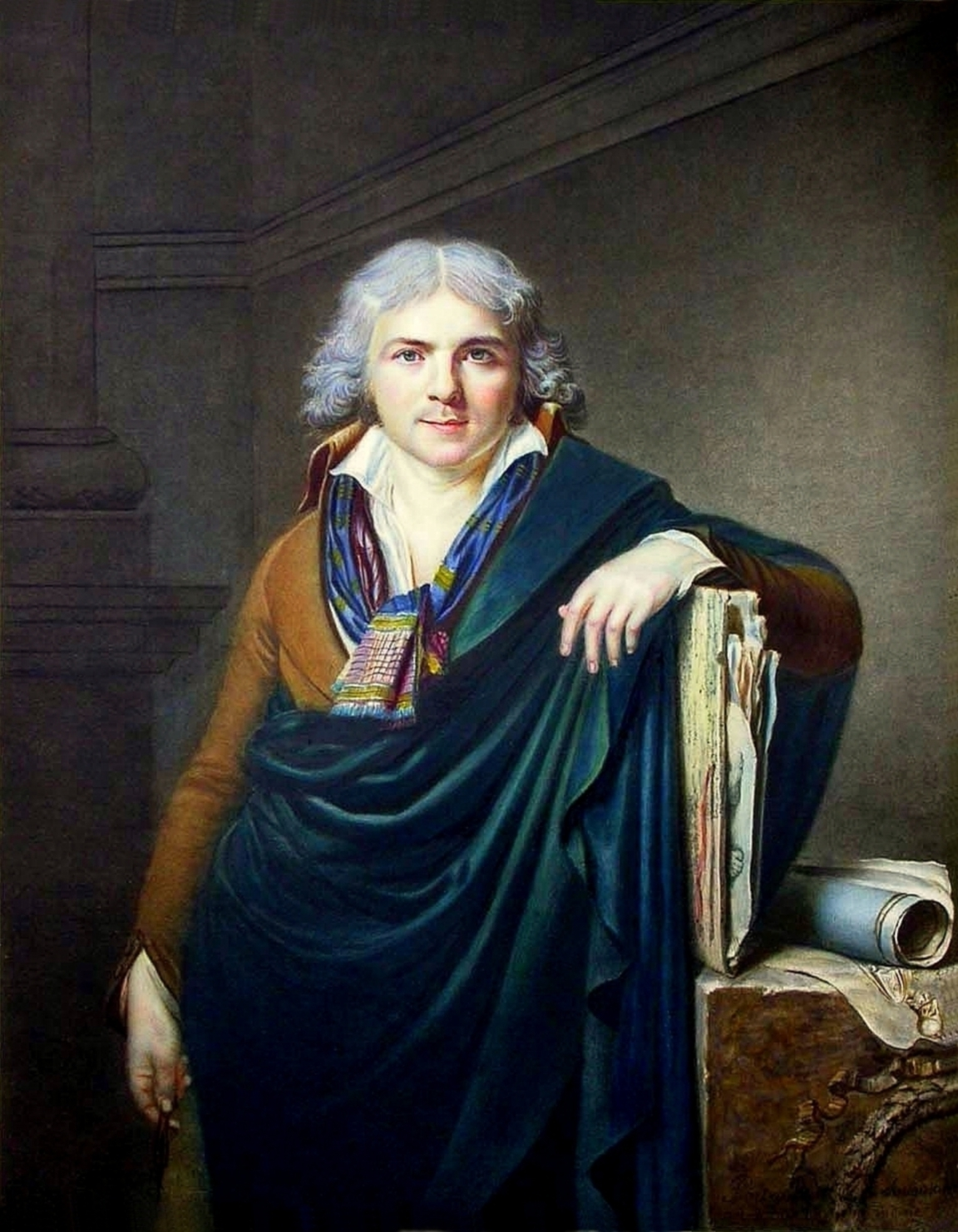
Jacques Augustin (Self-portrait)

== Born, educated or lived in Saint-Dié ==
- Jean Fredel, captain of the Duke of Lorraine, Charles II
- Claude Bausmont, "châtelain" and "cellerier" of Saint-Dié (1430–1477).
- Vautrin Lud (1448–1527), canon, master of the brotherhood of Saint Sébastien, and hypothetical creator of the Gymnasium Vosagense in the year 1507.
- Mechtilde of the Blessed Sacrament, institutor of the order, "Bénédictines de l'adoration perpétuelle" (born Catherine Barre in 1619, died in Paris in 1698)
- Jacques Augustin (1759–1832), miniaturist painter born in St-Dié
- Dieudonné Dubois (1759–1803), lawyer and member of Conseil des Cinq-Cents in the revolutionary year IV and conseil d'État in year VIII.
- Nicolas Souhait (1773–1799), colonel du génie born in Saint-Dié
- Nicolas Philippe Guye (1773–1845), general and mayor of Saint-Dié in 1829
- Antonio de Sedella, Catholic missionary in Canada born in Saint-Dié
- Léon Carrière (1814–1877), physician, father of Paul Carrière, the forestry restorer in the south Alps.
- Jean-Romary Grosjean (1815–1888), musicologist and cathedral organist, who first published "Il est né, le divin Enfant" (the well-known traditional French Christmas carol) <New Oxford Book of Carols, p. 631> in 1862.
- Henry Bardy (1829–1909), pharmacist, president-founder of the Société Philomatique Vosgienne.
- Emile Erckmann, writer who lived in the château de l'Hermitage between 1870 and 1880.
- Jules Ferry (1832–1893), lawyer and politician, born in Saint-Dié.
- Henri Rovel (1849–1926), painter and meteorologist born and dead in Saint-Dié
- Paul Descelles (1851–1915), painter
- Victor Franck (1852–1907), photographer born in Saint-Dié.
- Ferdinand Brunot (1860–1938), grammatician (linguistics) born in Saint-Dié.
- Léon Julien Griache (1861–1914), général de brigade d’artillerie born in Saint-Dié
- Fernand Baldensperger (1871–1958), academic (literature)
- Brothers Grollemund, polytechnicians and généraux de brigade: Marie-Joseph (1875–1954) and Marie-Paul Vincent (1879–1953)
- Victor-Charles Antoine (1881–1959), sculptor and engraver born in Saint-Dié
- Albert Ohl des Marais, engraver and historian
- Georges Baumont (1885–1974), professor of literature, librarian and local historian
- Yvan Goll (1891–1950), poet and novelist, born in Saint-Dié
- Jacques Brenner (1922–2001), writer and critic born in saint-Dié.
- Emmanuel Clément-Demange (born 1970 in saint-Dié), French former professional footballer
- Kalidou Koulibaly, athlete born in Saint-Die
- Yass puma, born in Saint-Die

== Higher education ==
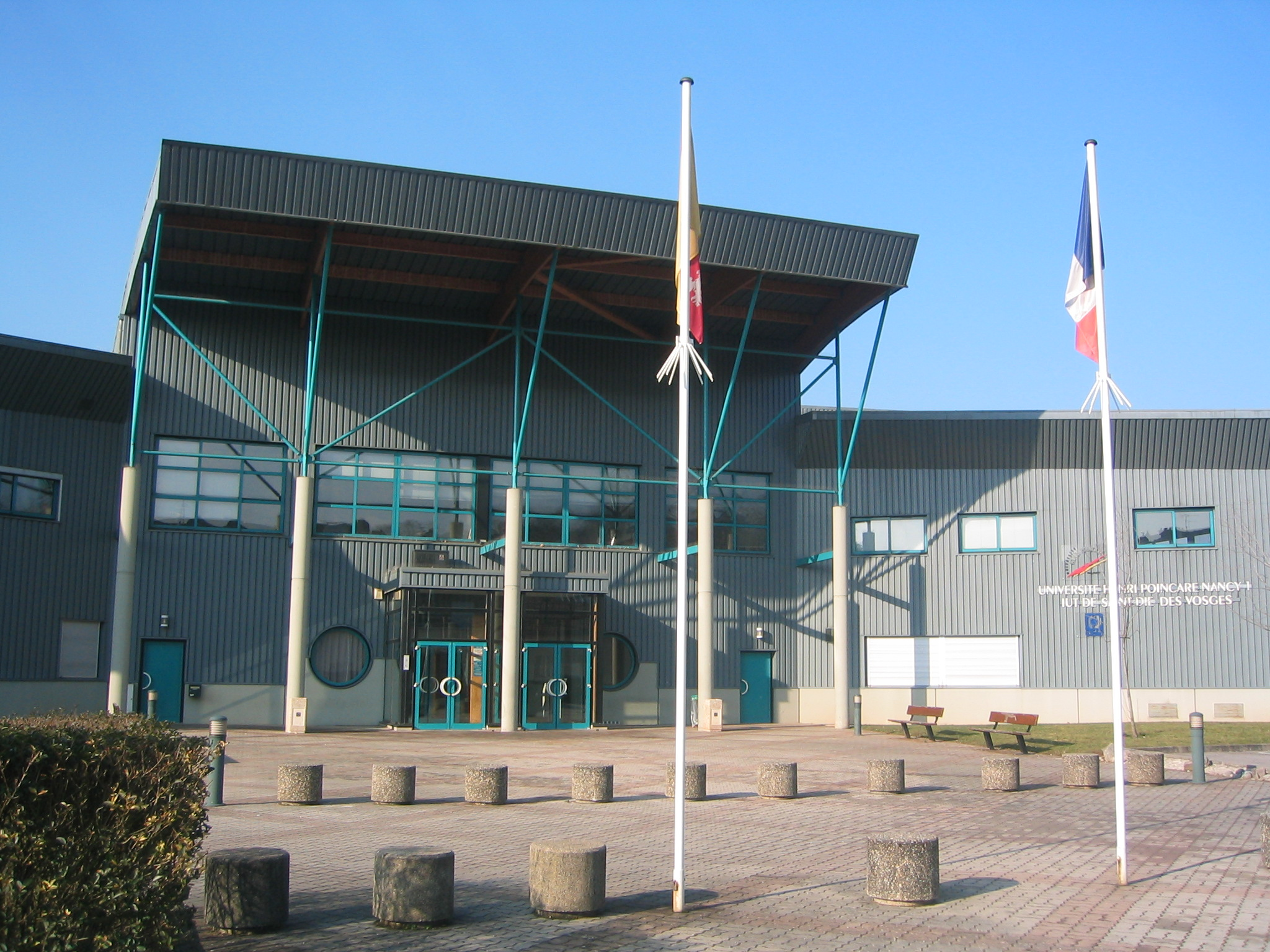
Institut Universitaire de Technologique

University Institute of Technology: IUT (Institut universitaire de technologie)

- Robotics
- Electronics
- Computing
- Internet
- Graphic design
- Communication

== Twin towns – sister cities ==
Saint-Dié-des-Vosges is twinned with:

- Arlon, Belgium (1962)
- Cattolica, Italy (1997)
- Crikvenica, Croatia (2006)
- Friedrichshafen, Germany (1973)
- Lorraine, Quebec, Canada (1990)
- Lowell, Massachusetts, United States (1989)
- Meckhe, Senegal (1991)
- Zakopane, Poland (1990)

== See also ==
- Communes of the Vosges department
