= Meurthe (river) =

River in France

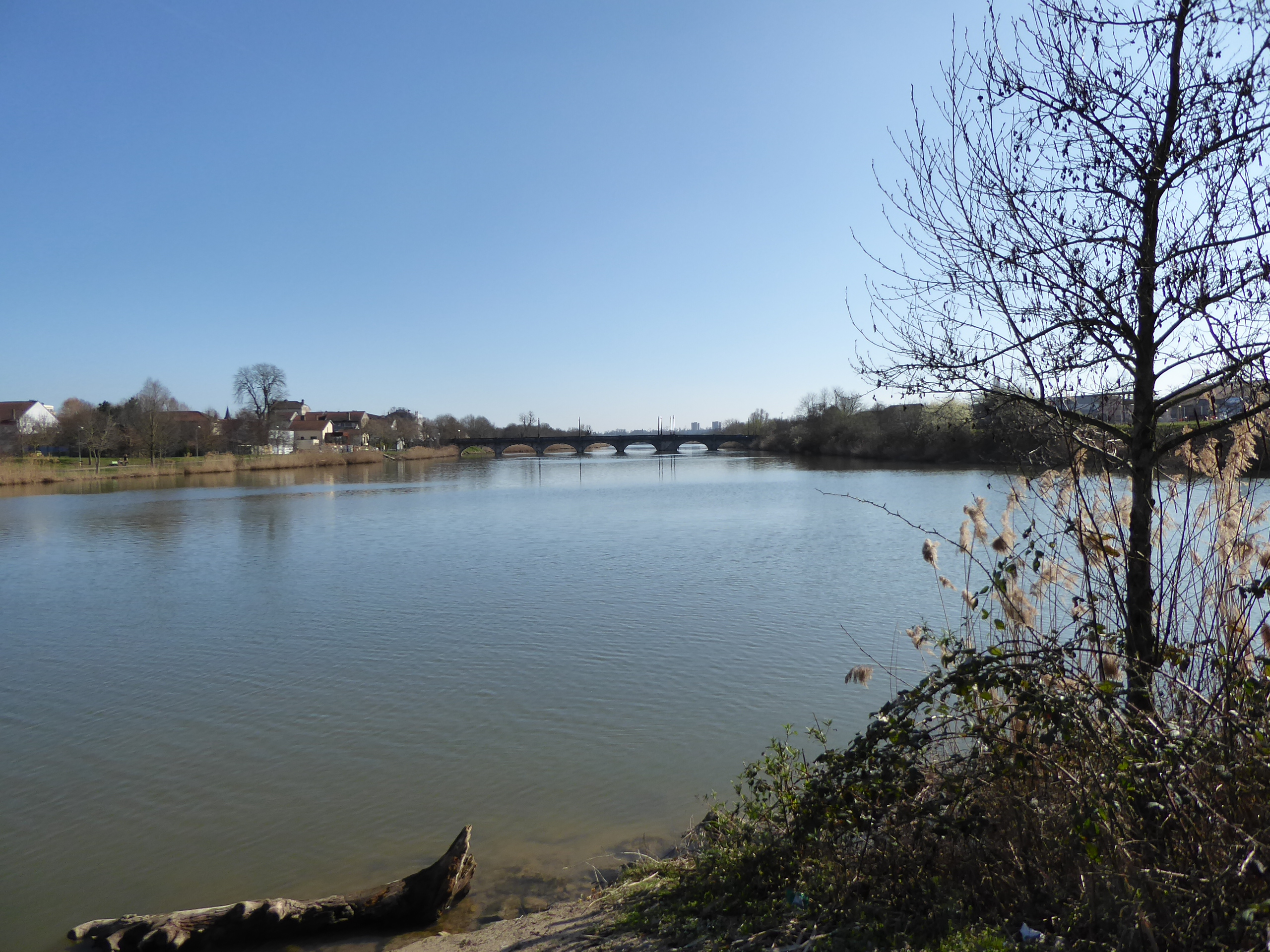
- The Meurthe in Nancy

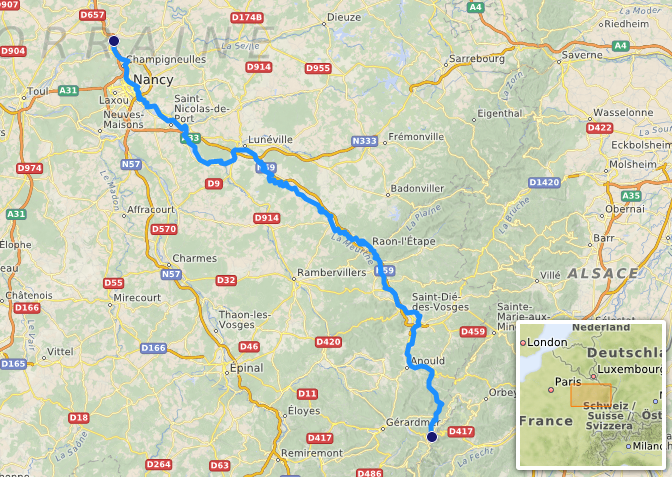

Location
- Country: France
- Region: Grand Est

Physical characteristics
- Source
  - location: Vosges mountains
  - coordinates: 48°03′25″N 7°00′50″E
  - elevation: 1,190 m (3,900 ft)
- Mouth
  - location: Moselle
  - coordinates: 48°46′48″N 6°8′29″E
- Length: 161 km (100 mi)
- Basin size: 3,085 km^{2} (1,191 mi^{2})
- Discharge
  - average: 41 m^{3}/s (1,400 cu ft/s)

Basin features
- Progression: Moselle→ Rhine→ North Sea

The Meurthe (French pronunciation: [mœʁt]) is a river in north-eastern France, right tributary to the river Moselle. It is 161 km (100 mi) long. Its source is in the Vosges mountains, near the Col de la Schlucht in the Vosges département, from where it flows in an overall north-westerly direction. Its name gave rise to the naming of the present French département Meurthe-et-Moselle and the former (before the change in the Franco-German border after the Franco-Prussian War of 1870) département Meurthe.

Channelled during its route through Nancy, the river flows into the Moselle at Pompey on the northern edge of Nancy, a short distance down-stream from the Port of Frouard.

Towns along the river Meurthe include:

- in Vosges: Fraize, Saint-Dié-des-Vosges, Raon-l'Étape
- in Meurthe-et-Moselle: Baccarat, Lunéville and Nancy

Tributaries include:

- Fave
- Rabodeau
- Plaine
- Vezouze
- Mortagne
- Sânon
