= Richer of Senones =

Medieval French historian

Richer of Senones (sometimes in French: Richer le Lorrain) (circa 1190–1266) was a monk and chronicler of Senones Abbey in Lorraine, a traveller and one of the very few chroniclers or historians of the Vosges whose works have survived complete.

== Life ==
He was born probably around 1190, quite possibly in the Val de Lièpvre (now in Haut-Rhin), perhaps a younger son of an Alsatian or Lotharingian noble family. He studied at Strasbourg and was admitted to Senones Abbey under abbot Henri (1202–1225). In about 1218 Richer was sent as an ambassador of Senones to Würzburg when Theobald I, Duke of Lorraine, was prisoner of Emperor Frederick II, after the fire of Nancy and the siege of Amance.

He travelled extensively throughout the Vosges, which he knew extremely well, and throughout Alsace and Lorraine, where he often encountered monks from Lièpvre Priory as well as monks from St. Denis' Abbey in Paris, who had possessions in the Val de Lièpvre. He visited St. Denis' Abbey himself in 1223, probably together with monks from Lièpvre. He often visited the castles of Bilstein in Urbeis and Échéry in Sainte Croix-aux-Mines, as well as the renowned castle of Bernstein. He also knew Gorze Abbey, St. Evre's Abbey, Toul, and the abbey at Saint-Dié.

== Works ==
Richer is an enthusiastic recorder of his travels, and of religious stories and traditions that he has encountered. Unusually for the time, he is also a fine observer of landscapes, particularly the spectacular scenery of the Vosges, and takes great pains to describe what he has observed. A peculiarity of his language is the use of the word "Teudons" to describe the inhabitants of Alsace.

His Latin chronicles survive in nine copy manuscripts. Four date from the 16th century, two are translations, another two are from the 17th century and one is from 1826. The copies originate from the monasteries at Senones, Moyenmoutier and Etival.

== Sources ==
- Dantand, Dominique, 1988: Chronique de Richer, moine de Senones au XIIIe siècle. DEA d’Histoire médiévale, Université de Nancy II
- Dantand, Dominique, 1996: La Chronique de Richer de Senones. Présentation, édition et traduction. Doctorat d’Histoire Médiévale, Université de Nancy II
- Jérôme, L. 1902: L’Abbaye de Moyenmoutier. Librairie Victor Lecoffre
- Gasse-Grandjean, Marie José, 1992: Les livres dans les abbayes vosgiennes du Moyen Âge. Presses Universitaires de Nancy
