= Rémy Ceillier =

French ecclesiastical historian (1688 – 1761)

- Born: 14 May 1688; Bar-le-Duc, Duchy of Bar
- Died: 17 November 1761; Flavigny-sur-Ozerain, Kingdom of France
- Occupations: Historian, monk

Rémy (or Rémi) Ceillier (1688 – November 17, 1761) was a Benedictine monk of the Lorraine Congregation of St. Vanne. An eminent French theologian, he was an ecclesiastical historian.

== Biography ==
Rémy Ceillier was born in Bar-le-Duc. He received his early education at the Jesuit College at Bar-le-Duc. After completing the course of humanities and rhetoric, he entered, in 1705, the monastery of Moyenmoutier in the Vosges, belonging to the Benedictine congregation of St-Vannes and St-Hydulphe.

Later he was appointed professor in the same monastery, a position which he held for six years. In 1716 he was made dean of Moyenmoutier, in 1718 prior of the monastery of Saint Jacques de Neufchâteau, in 1724 assistant to Charles de Vassimont at the priory of Flavigny-sur-Moselle, and on the latter's death in 1733 prior of that monastery. Under his wise administration this monastery flourished.

== Works ==
While a professor at Moyenmoutier, he wrote an "Apologie de la morale des Pères, contre les injustes accusations du sieur Jean Barbeyrac, professeur en droit et en histoire à Lausanne" (Paris, 1718). This was a dissertation of forty pages establishing the authority of the Fathers of the Church; afterwards the author follows step by step the arguments of Barbeyrac, and defends individually those Fathers whom he had attacked — Athenagoras, Clement of Alexandria, Augustine, and others.

This was followed by the Histoire générale des auteurs sacrés et ecclésiastiques (23 vols., Paris, 1729–1763), a history and analysis of the writings of ecclesiastical writers of the first thirteen centuries. A later and improved edition in 14 volumes was produced in Paris in 1858. Ceillier's other work, Apologie de la morale des Pères de l'Église (Paris, 1718), also won fame.

The most valuable portion of Ceillier's Histoire généale des auteurs sacrés et ecclésiastiques is that dealing with the Church Fathers of the first six centuries. Here the author was able to draw upon the writings of Louis-Sébastien Le Nain de Tillemont and use the scholarly Benedictine editions of the Church fathers. Charges of Jansenism made against Ceillier in his lifetime and afterwards find no substantiation in his writings, and the treatment accorded to the author and his works by Pope Benedict XIV shows that the pope had no doubts as to his orthodoxy.
