= Hildulf =

Benedictine abbot

Hildulf (Note: Also: Hidulf, Hidulfus, Hidulphus, Hiduiphus, Hidulphe, Hydulphe.) (died 707) was an abbot, founder of Moyenmoutier Abbey, and reputed bishop of Trier. He is a Catholic and Orthodox saint. His feast day is 11 July.

== Narrative ==
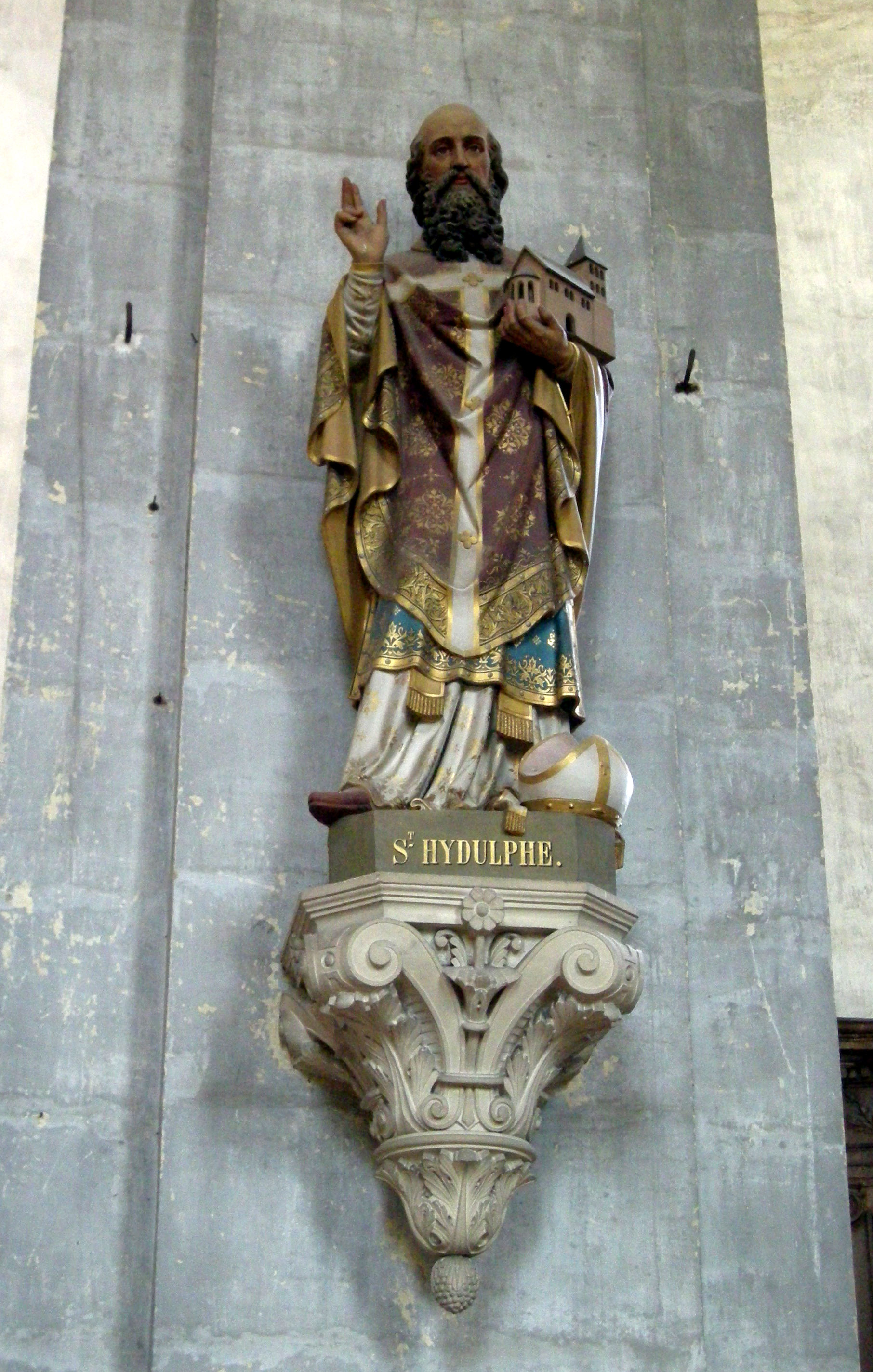
Hildulf, statue in the abbey church at Moyenmoutier.

There are three biographies (Vitae Hidulphi), all from the 11th century, which contradict each other on a number of points. There is little doubt about his founding of Moyenmoutier, but the three subsequent hagiographies are suspect in the eyes of historians. While acknowledging that some authors place Hildulf's birthplace in Belgium or Bavaria, hagiographer John O'Hanlon lists him with the Irish saints.

Hildulf was born sometime in the early 6th century to a noble family, possibly in Bavaria. He is said to have had two brothers, Saints Albert and Erhard of Regensburg. Hildulf was sent to Regensburg to complete his studies.

Hildulf went to Trier, where he became a monk at the Abbey of Saint Maximin.

He was a friend of Saint Deodatus, who had previously been bishop of Nevers in France, but had since retired to solitude. Deodatus had founded a monastery for Augustinian canons, which was later named Saint-Dié (Sancti Deodati). After his death, Hildulf took over as abbot of the monastery. Many scholars believe that this connection is unlikely.

Many traditions say that in 665 he was elected bishop of Trier after Saint Numerian. He is said to have built the Johanniskirche in Trier and endowed it with the relics of some martyrs of the Theban Legion, and in 667 he brought relics of the city's saints, Saints Maximin, Agritius, Nicetius and Basinus over to the abbey church of Saint Maximin.

A contemporary view is that he was not a diocesan bishop, nor abbot of Saint-Dié Abbey. Some sources believe that he was probably not a diocesan bishop, but a chorepiscopus, that is, an auxiliary bishop without a fixed episcopate, but associated with the monastery of St Maximinus in Trier, which is perhaps more likely. This type of bishop was common in the mission areas of Germany in the seventh century and played a significant role in the evangelization of the country.

After five years, Hildulf handed over the office to Basinus and retired to a hermitage in the Vosges. Hildulf founded the monastery of Moyenmoutier soon after 671. He himself called the monastery Monasterium Medium or Mittelmünster (Moyenmoutier) due to its location in the middle of a group of four other monasteries. Hildulf became the first abbot and held office until his death. At first he followed a rule partly based on Saint Benedict 's and partly on that established by Saint Columban. As a crowd of monks soon gathered around him, he had to move some of them to several sub-monasteries. In total, he is said to have had almost 300 monks under his leadership in the various foundations. His foremost disciples were Saint Spinulus (fr: Spinule; locally Spin) and the two holy twin brothers Benignus and Johannes. As was common in this group of monasteries, Hildulf emphasized the importance of manual labor, and it was said that he himself always did some work every day, except in his last years.

Hildulf is said to have been present and participated in the miracle that his brother Erhard wrought with Saint Odilia of Alsace(ca. 660-ca. 720) when she was baptized. At his death he was abbot of both Moyenmoutier and Bonmoutier (Galilaea, later called Saint-Dié).

== Veneration ==
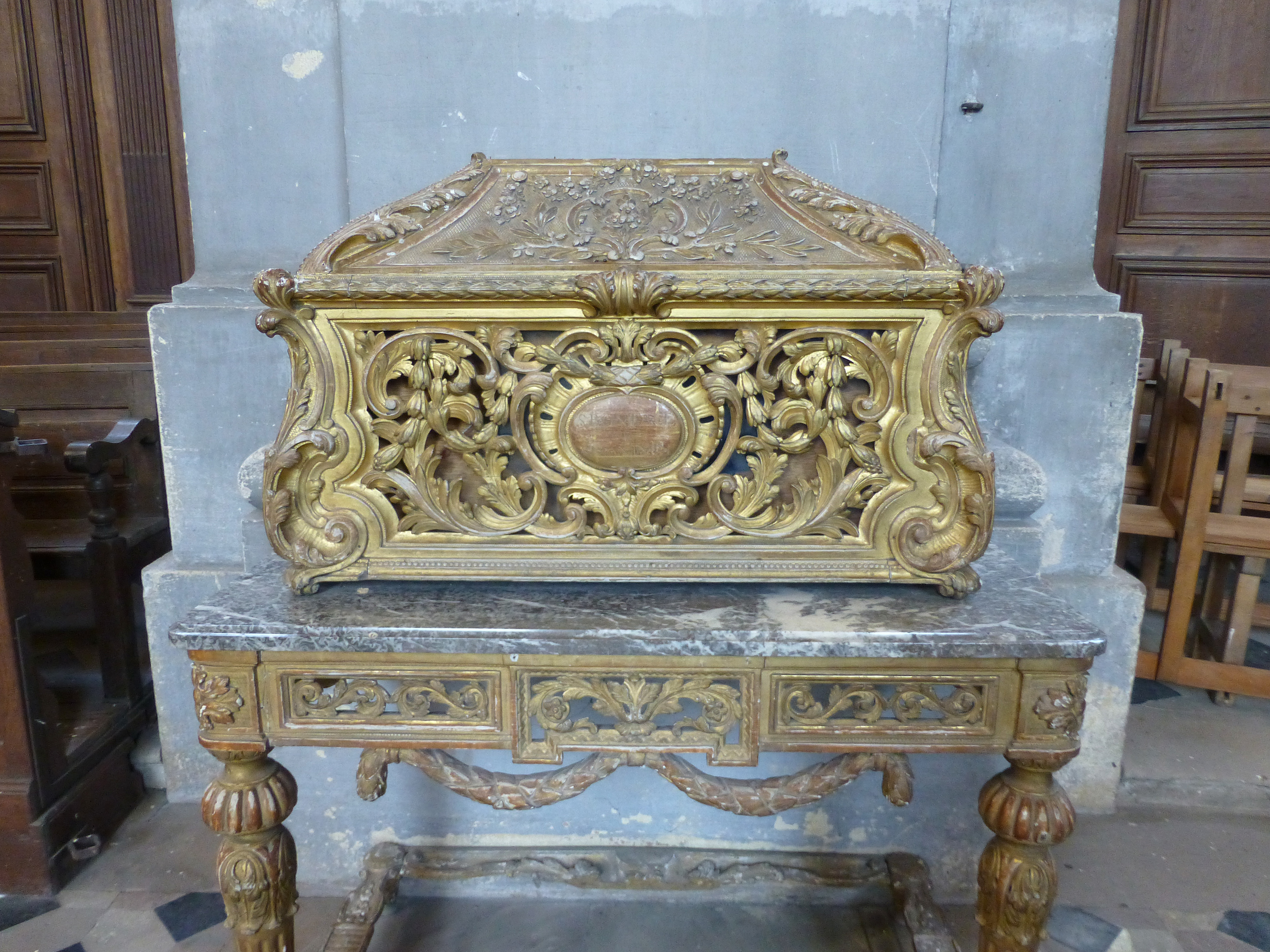
Abbaye de Moyenmoutier-reliquaire

Legend has it that Hildulf was buried in a sandstone sarcophagus in Moyenmoutier, and it can still be seen in the old chapel of Saint-Grégoire in this commune. His relics were moved a number of times, and from 1854 they have been venerated in a side chapel in the former abbey church of Moyenmoutier. Hildulf's casket in carved and gilded wood from the 18th century, is kept in the treasury in Moyenmoutier. It was classified as a historical monument in 1965.

In 1600, the prior of the Benedictine monastery of Saint-Vanne outside the city walls of Verdun, Dom Didier de La Cour, began a thorough reform of the monastery, and it, together with Moyenmoutier, became the center of a group of reformed monasteries in Lorraine, Champagne and Burgundy. In 1604 they officially merged into a new congregation, de Saint-Vanne et Saint-Hydulphe, named after Hildulf and Saint Vitonus of Verdun, (which was dissolved during the French Revolution).

Hildulf was invoked in nervous diseases. He is listed in the Martyrologium Romanum (2004) for July 11.

== See also ==
- Erhard of Regensburg
- Odile of Alsace
