= Leudinus =

Bishop of Toul

Leudinus Bodo was a seventh-century bishop of Toul, successor to Eborinus, or Elbonirus. He was a Benedictine. He occurs in hagiographies. His feast day is Sept. 11.

He is traditionally known as the founder of Bodonis Monasterium (the monastery of Bodo), later called Bon-Moutier (Bonmoutier, Bon Moustiers). Bonmoutier is in the modern Val-et-Châtillon, Vosges.

He is said to have been born around 625, in Bassigny, to Gundoin and Saratrude of the Etichonids, a family of the Austrasian nobility. His sister was Sadalberga, who founded the monastery at Laon. He founded also the Abbey of Étival (Stivagium, Abbaye Saint-Pierre d'Étival), dated to 663 and the Abbey of Othonville, and died around 678.
