= Eric of Lorraine =

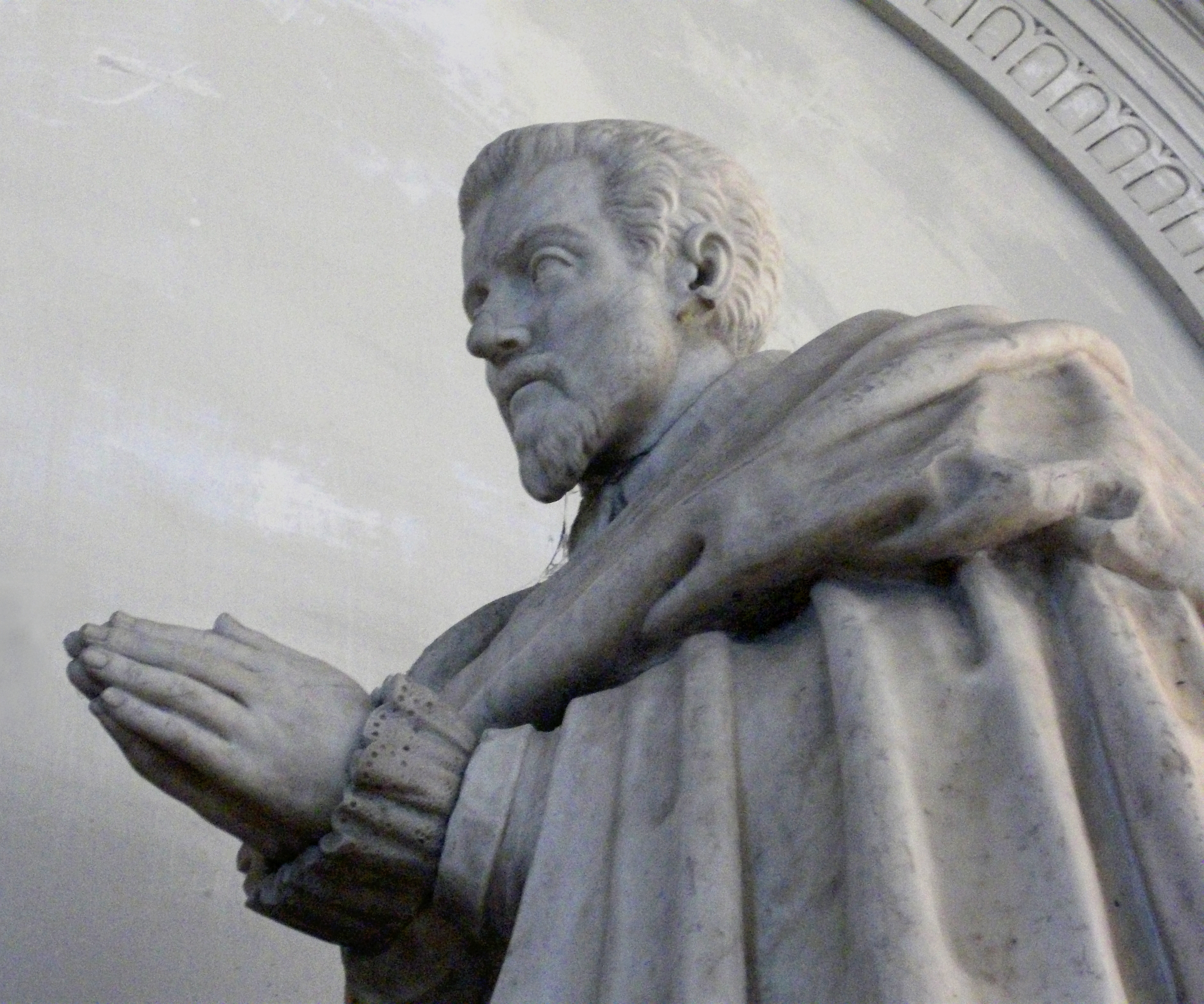
Funerary monument in the Franciscan church in Nancy, France.

Eric of Lorraine (14 March 1576 – 27 April 1623), count of Vaudémont, was a Bishop of Verdun and half brother of Louise of Lorraine, Queen consort of France.

== Biography ==
Eric of Lorraine was born in Nancy on 14 March 1576 as a son of Nicolas, Duke of Mercœur and his third wife Catherine of Lorraine (1550–1606), daughter of Claude, Duke of Aumale. Some sources attribute a turbulent youth to him, which did not prevent him from being destined for a career in the Church; he was provided with the Abbey of St. Hydulphe at Moyenmoutier on 31 March 1588. He was also the commendatory abbot of the Monastery of St Vanne near Verdun. He was appointed bishop of Verdun in 1593 when he was only seventeen years old.

By the end of the 16th century, with the religious world across western Europe undergoing the confrontation between the Protestant winds from Germany and the Counter-Reformation forces confronting them, there was a feeling that monasticism in Moyenmoutier had fallen into a sorry state. Eric undertook to restore a more orderly existence to the monks under his authority. He entrusted this task to Dom Didier de La Cour. In 1604 the resulting new constitution of the Congregation of St. Vanne and St. Hydulphe received Pope Clement VII's approval. The reforms became an important element in Catholic reform, being copied by other Catholic religious houses and congregations, most famously, in 1621, the Congregation of St. Maur.

In the following year he considered becoming a Jesuit. He went to Rome, but the Pope dissuaded him from this idea. He returned to Verdun in 1597 and, encouraged by Cardinal Bellarmine, showed himself a model bishop: he organized synods and played an important part in the reform of the Benedictine orders in Lorraine.

However, in 1605 he was involved in a scandal. He fell in love with and married a woman called Marie Dupuy (died 1640). Eric was suspended on 19 December 1605 and subsequently brought before the tribunal of the Inquisition. As punishment he was relegated to the Jesuits of Pont-à-Mousson. In his defense, he alleged that he was bewitched. As a result, Eric was exorcised before being re-established in his diocese in 1608.

In 1610, he renounced his office as bishop of Verdun in favor of his nephew Charles, and retreated to the Capuchins. He died in Nancy in 1623. Initially he was buried in the church of the convent of the Capuchins of Varangéville. In 1792 his remains were repatriated to the Church of Saint-François-des-Cordeliers.
