= Moyenmoutier =

- Commune
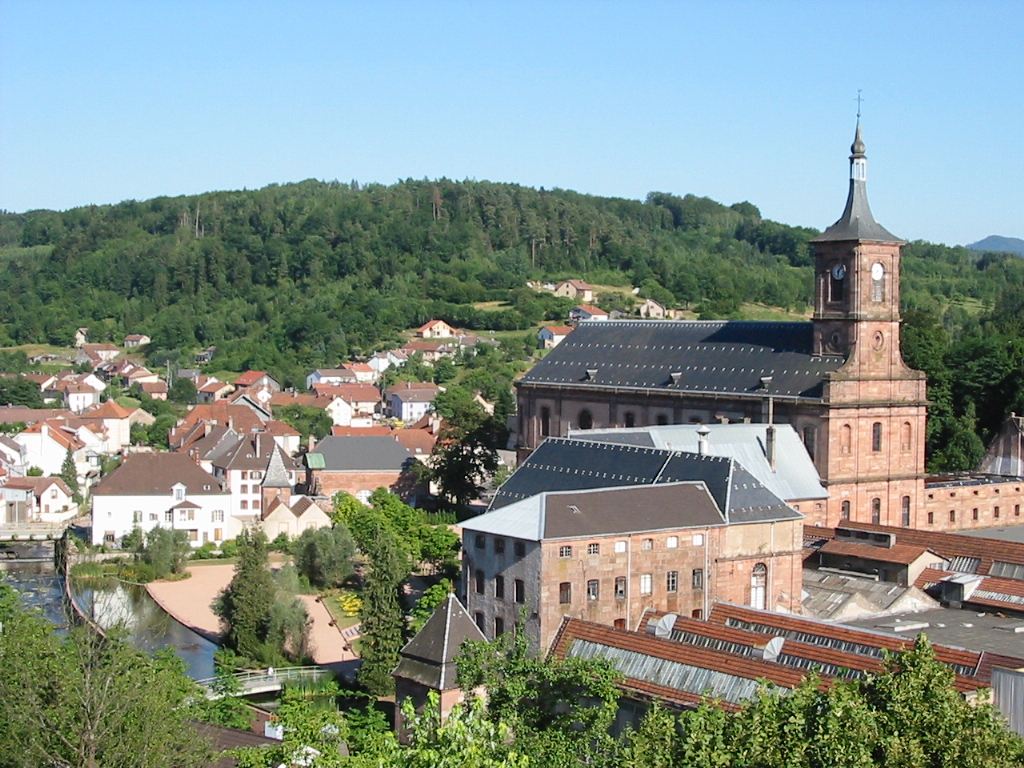
- View of the town center and Moyenmoutier Abbey

- Coat of arms
- Location of Moyenmoutier
- Location within France Location within Grand Est
- Coordinates: 48°22′50″N 6°54′51″E
- Country: France
- Region: Grand Est
- Department: Vosges
- Arrondissement: Saint-Dié-des-Vosges
- Canton: Raon-l'Étape
- Intercommunality: CA Saint-Dié-des-Vosges

Government
  - Mayor (2020–2026): Jean Hirli
- Area^{1}: 34.21 km^{2} (13.21 sq mi)
- Elevation: 320 m (1,050 ft)
- Highest elevation: 642 m (2,106 ft)
- Lowest elevation: 285 m (935 ft)
- Population (2023): 3,134
  - Density: 91.61/km^{2} (237.3/sq mi)
- Time zone: UTC+01:00 (CET)
  - Summer (DST): UTC+02:00 (CEST)
- INSEE/Postal code: 88319 /88420
- ^{1} French Land Register data, which excludes lakes, ponds, glaciers > 1 km^{2} (0.386 sq mi or 247 acres) and river estuaries.

Moyenmoutier (French pronunciation: [mwajɛ̃mutje]; German: Mittelmünster) is a commune in the Vosges department in Grand Est in northeastern France.

== Geography ==
The little town of Moyenmoutier is positioned along the lower part of the Rabodeau valley, at an average altitude of 320 meters. To the north-east, just over 5 kilometres (3 mi) away up the valley, is Senones. Further away are Saint-Dié-des-Vosges, 17 kilometres (11 mi) to the south and Nancy some 76 kilometres (47 mi) to the north-west.

Moyenmoutier is arranged into various quarters as follows:

- Centre
- Le Rabodeau
- Le Pair
- la Chapelle
- Saint-Prayel
- la Prelle
- les Voitines
- le Grand Himbeaumont
- le Petit Himbeaumont
- Saint-Blaise

The commune also includes several more isolated hamlets, including les Azelis, le Cadran Bleu, les Quatre Chemins, la Bergerie, la Pépinière, les Baraques and les Fossés.

== History ==
The origin of the name Moyenmoutier is the obvious one. The monastery (moutier) founded by Saint Hydulphe in 671 was located between four others, at Senones to the east, Étival to the west, Saint-Dié to the south and Bonmoutier (at Val-et-Châtillon) to the north. Taken together these five monasteries subsequently, in a more map conscious age, have become known as the Sacred Cross of Lorraine (la Croix Sacrée de Lorraine).

In 915 the abbey was pillaged and torched by a Hungarian raiding party; it was rebuilt around 960. In the 12th century Aubert of Paroye built a hilltop castle on the Rock of St Peter, but this was destroyed in the 13th century under orders from the Duke of Lorraine.

The monastery dominated local life, sharing the ups and downs of the ensuing centuries with the little town that surrounded it. By the end of the 16th century, with the religious world across western Europe undergoing the confrontation between the Protestant winds from Germany and the Counter Reformation forces confronting it, there was a feeling that monasticism in Moyenmoutier had fallen into a sorry state. The commendatory abbot of Moyenmoutier, Eric of Lorraine who was also the Bishop of Verdun and commendatory abbot of the Monastery of St Vanne in Verdun, undertook to restore a more orderly existence to the monks under his authority. He entrusted the task to Dom Didier de La Cour. In 1604 the resulting new constitution of the Congrégation of St. Vanne and St. Hydulphe received papal approval. The reforms became an important element in the Counter Reformation, being copied by other Catholic religious houses and congregations including in 1621, most famously, the Congregation of St. Maur.

The 18th century was a golden age for the Abbey at Moyenmoutier which for many years numbered among its scholars of philosophy and theology Dom Augustin Calmet, who in 1728 went on to become abbot at Senones. The French Revolution called time on the monastic existence, however, and in 19th century Moyenmoutier the chanting of monks was replaced by noise of industrial machines.

The commune enjoyed considerable prosperity during the 19th century and well into the early decades of the 20th century thanks to the textile industry. The twentieth crisis in the European textile sector would be reflected by a population decline as people moved away in search if employment.

One of the last mainstream steam railway services in France ran along the Rabodeau valley, with a stop at Moyenmoutier, until the 1970s when it was abandoned by the public railway company. The Rabodeau steam railway continued to be operated by enthusiasts as a heritage railway until 1982.

== Population ==
Historical population
Year	Pop.	±% p.a.
1968	4,148	—
1975	3,854	−1.04%
1982	3,498	−1.38%
1990	3,304	−0.71%
1999	3,350	+0.15%
2007	3,326	−0.09%
2012	3,289	−0.22%
2017	3,186	−0.63%
2023	3,134	−0.27%
Source: INSEE

Inhabitants are called Médianimonastériens in French.

== Notable people ==
- Dominique Ottato (born 1968), footballer

== See also ==
- Communes of the Vosges department
