= Congregation of St. Vanne =

The Congregation of St. Vanne or Congregation of St. Vanne and St. Hydulphe (French: Congrégation de Saint-Vanne et Saint-Hydulphe (Note: sometimes also "St. Vanne's", sometimes also known as the "Vannists" or "Vannistes") was a Benedictine reform movement centered in the Duchy of Lorraine. It was formally established in 1604 on the initiative of Didier de La Cour, prior of the Abbey of Saint-Vanne (Note: dedicated to Saint Vitonus) near Verdun, a reformer of the Benedictine Order after the Council of Trent. The Abbey of St. Hydulphe at Moyenmoutier was a secondary centre of the reform.

== Abbey of Saint-Vanne ==
A church dedicated to Vitonus (Saint Vanne) in Verdun was mentioned in documents as early as 701. The Benedictine Abbey of St-Vanne, dedicated to Vitonus, was established on the site in 952.

== History ==
To counteract the evils resulting from the practice of bestowing ecclesiastical benefices upon secular persons in commendam, then rife throughout Western Europe, Didier de la Cour, Prior of the Abbey of St.-Vannes in Lorraine, inaugurated in 1598 a strict disciplinary reform with the full approbation of the commendatory abbot, Eric of Lorraine, the Bishop of Verdun. Eric of Lorraine was also commendatory abbot of St Hidulf's in Moyenmoutier and the reforms were next introduced there. With the approval of Pope Clement VIII, the "Congregation of St. Vanne and St. Hydulphe" was formally established in 1604.

Other monasteries soon followed suit and the reform was introduced into all the houses of Alsace and Lorraine, as well as many in different parts of France. In 1604, the Congregation of St. Vanne was formed, which brought together all the reformist monasteries of Lorraine.

Jean Regnault, abbot of St. Augustine's in Limoges, adopted La Cour's reforms in 1613. This was followed by the Abbey of St. Faron near Meaux, St. Julien's at Nouilly, and St. Peter's at Jumièges.

The response to the attempts to return the Benedictine houses to a more rigorous way of life in accordance with the Rule, combined with serious study and scholarship, was very positive, but Lorraine was not at that time under the French crown. A parallel movement specifically for the Benedictine monasteries in the Kingdom of France, on the same principles as those of the Congregation of St. Vanne, was therefore launched from the Abbey of Saint-Germain-des-Prés in Paris in 1621, and gave rise to the Congregation of St. Maur, which became better known than the Vannists.

By the time of Didier's death in 1623, the congregation contained forty monasteries in three provinces.The 18th century was a golden age for the Abbey at Moyenmoutier which for many years numbered among its scholars of philosophy and theology Antoine Augustin Calmet, who in 1728 went on to become abbot at Senones Abbey. The Congregation of St. Vanne continued in Lorraine in parallel to that of St. Maur until the French Revolution, when both were abolished.

Distinguished Vannist scholars included Rémy Ceillier, Nicolas Tabouillot, Thierry Ruinart and Ambroise Pelletier. The noted Dom Perignon, of champagne fame, was a member of this congregation.

== Didier de La Cour ==
Didier de La Cour de La Vallée (1550 – 1623) was a Benedictine monk, responsible for the foundation of the congregation in 1604. Didier de La Cour was born at Montzéville, Meuse, in December 1550, into an ancient noble family of Lorraine but one which had grown so poor that they were obliged to work on their own lands. At 18, he entered St. Vanne's Abbey in Verdun and later studied at the University of Pont-à-Mousson, where he became friendly with Servais de Lairuelz and Saint Pierre Fourier.

La Cour became prior of St. Vanne's Abbey. He wished to apply the Rule of St. Benedict in its original rigour, but met with some resistance from the other monks. However, he had the support of Eric of Lorraine, Bishop of Verdun, and commendatory abbot of St Vanne. Despite the initial difficulties, his efforts ultimately met with success. Eric of Lorraine was also commendatory abbot of St Hidulf's in Moyenmoutier and the reforms were next introduced there. With the approval of Pope Clement VIII, the Congregation of St. Vanne and St. Hydulphe was formally established in 1604.

== Influence and expansion ==
(in order of affiliation)

- Abbey of Saint-Vanne, Verdun, co-founding abbey
- Abbey of Saint-Hydulph, Moyenmoutier, co-founding abbey
- Abbey of Saint-Nabor, Saint-Avold (1607)
- Abbey of the Holy Cross, Bouzonville (1612)
- Abbey of Faverney (1613)
- Abbey of St. Peter, Senones (1618)
- Priory of St. Barbara, near Metz (1633)
- Monastery of Luxeuil (1634)
- Abbey of St. Peter, Montiéramey (1655-1790)
- Abbey of Sts. Peter and Paul, Pothières (1655)
- Abbey of Munster (1659)
- Priory of Notre Dame of Breuil, Commercy
- Abbey of St. Leopold, Nancy (n/a)
- Abbey of Saint Mansuy, Toul (n/a)
- Abbey of St. Maurus, Bleurville (n/a)
- Abbey of Notre Dame, (Mouzon, Ardennes) (n/a)
- Abbey of Novy, Ardennes (n/a)

== Sources ==
- Michaux, Gérard Michaux, 1998: Dom Didier de La Cour et la réforme des Bénédictins de Saint-Vanne in: Les Prémontrés et la Lorraine XIIe - XVIIIe siècle, pp. 125–144 (XXIIIe colloque du Centre d'études et de recherches prémontrées, under the direction of Dominique-Marie Dauzet and Martine Plouvier). Paris: Beauchesne.
- Dauphin, Hubert OSB (Quarr Abbey) 1947: L'Abbaye Saint-Vanne de Verdun et la Querelle des Investitures in: Revue Stydi Gregoriani per la Storia di Gregorio VII e Della Reforma Gregoriana, pp. 237–261 Roma: Abbazia di San Paolo di Roma
