= Montiéramey Abbey =

Benedictine abbey in Montiéramey, Aube, France

Coordinates: 48°13′45″N 4°18′22″E

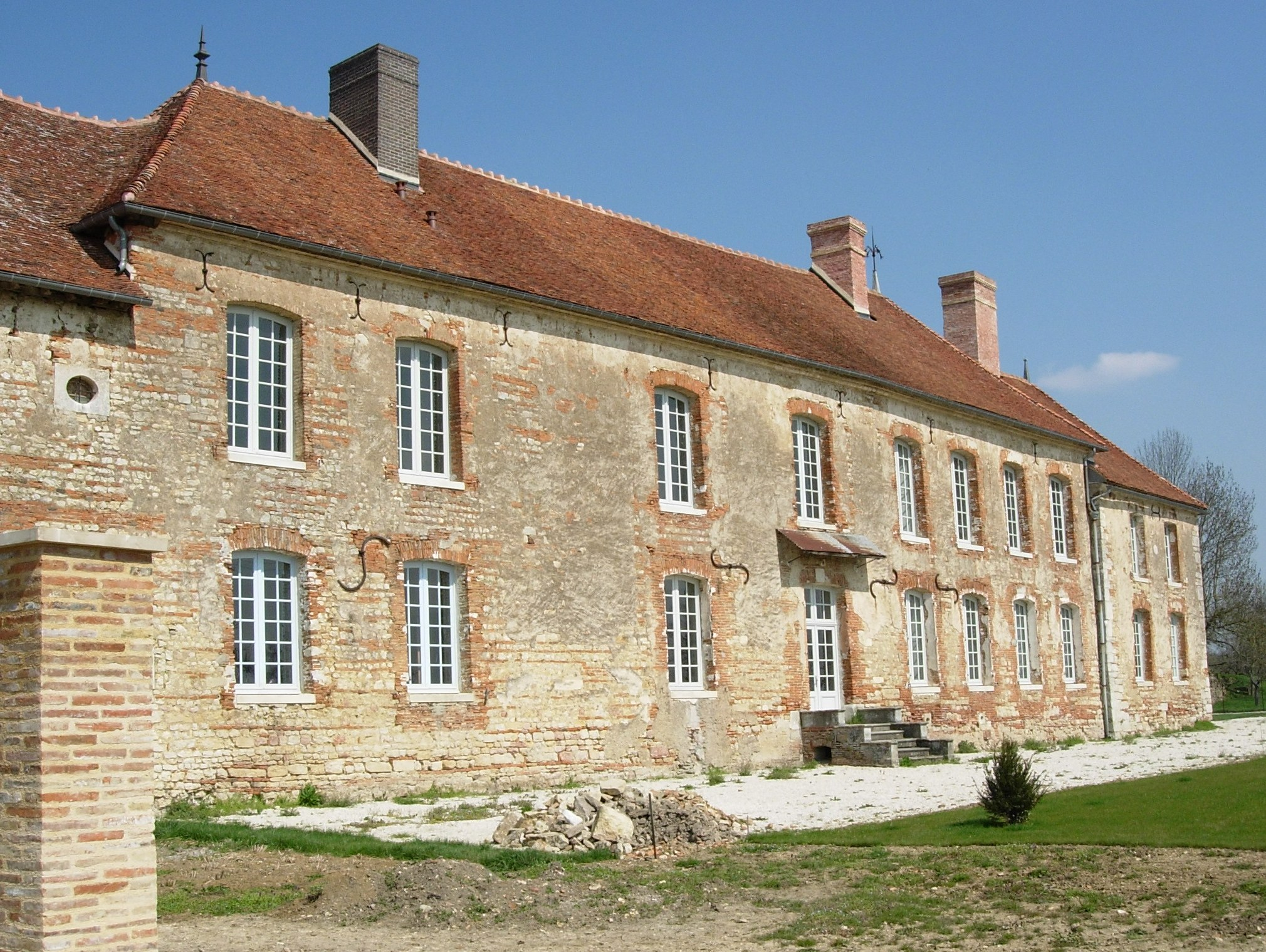
South range of the cloister, converted to private residences

Montiéramey Abbey (French: Abbaye de Montiéramey) is a former Benedictine abbey at Montiéramey, in France, in the department of Aube, in France. It was partly destroyed during the French Revolution; the surviving buildings are now private dwellings.

== History and buildings ==
The abbey, dedicated to Saint Peter, was founded in 837 on both banks of the Barse by Arremar, a monk of Troyes, and remained a house of the Benedictines until 1655, when it was reformed and became part of the Congregation of St. Vanne until its dissolution in 1790. The abbey church was completed in 1240.

The abbey was very prosperous in the 12th century with 14 dependent priories. In the 13th century it was surrounded by a wall, and the church was completed in 1240. The abbey was occupied by troops during the Hundred Years' War, after which it declined. It became commendatory in 1501.

During the 17th and 18th centuries the buildings were reconstructed. In 1669 the south range of the cloister was rebuilt in stone and brick. In 1715 the abbots' lodging was rebuilt, as later were the barn and the dovecote.

In the French Revolution all the buildings were destroyed except for the abbots' lodging, the barn and the dovecote.

The remaining structures were declared a monument historique in 2001, comprising the façades and roofs of the south range of the cloister, the abbots' lodging, the barn and the dovecote, as well as the former latrines and the floor of the former abbey (register numbers AD 103, 108, 113, 110).

== Library ==
The following titles are known from the abbey's library, all illuminated manuscripts of works by Peter Lombard:

- Sententiae (12th century), (MS.304 BM de Troyes)
- Comment. in Epistulas Pauli (first quarter of the 13th century), (MS.0175. BM de Troyes f°057)
- Vitæ sanctorum (12th century), (MS 0007.BM de Troyes)

== Archives ==
The abbey's surviving archives are kept at the Bibliothèque nationale de France. Of particular significance are the cartulary and a number of liturgical works.

== Abbots and priors ==
The abbots and priors included the following:

=== Conventual abbots ===
- Rolland - c. 1224
- Bruno - occurs 1397

=== Commendatory abbots ===
- Prior Dom Boniface Péronne - occurs 1662
- Piere de Pardaillan de Gondrin d'Antin - occurs 1718

== Bibliography ==
- d'Arbois de Jubainville, Henri (1872): Catalogue d'actes des comtes de Brienne, 950-1326 in Bibliothèque de l'école des chartes, 1872, pp. 141–186, vol. 33

== Sources and external links ==
- Base Mérimée: Abbaye de Montiéramey, Ministère français de la Culture. (in French)
- Données et services numériques de SHS (in French)
