= Gondelbert =

Saint and founder of Senones Abbey

Saint Gondelbert

Abbot, (?) Bishop of Sens
- Died: c. 676
- Venerated in: Roman Catholic Church; Eastern Orthodox Church
- Canonized: Pre-Congregation
- Feast: 21 February

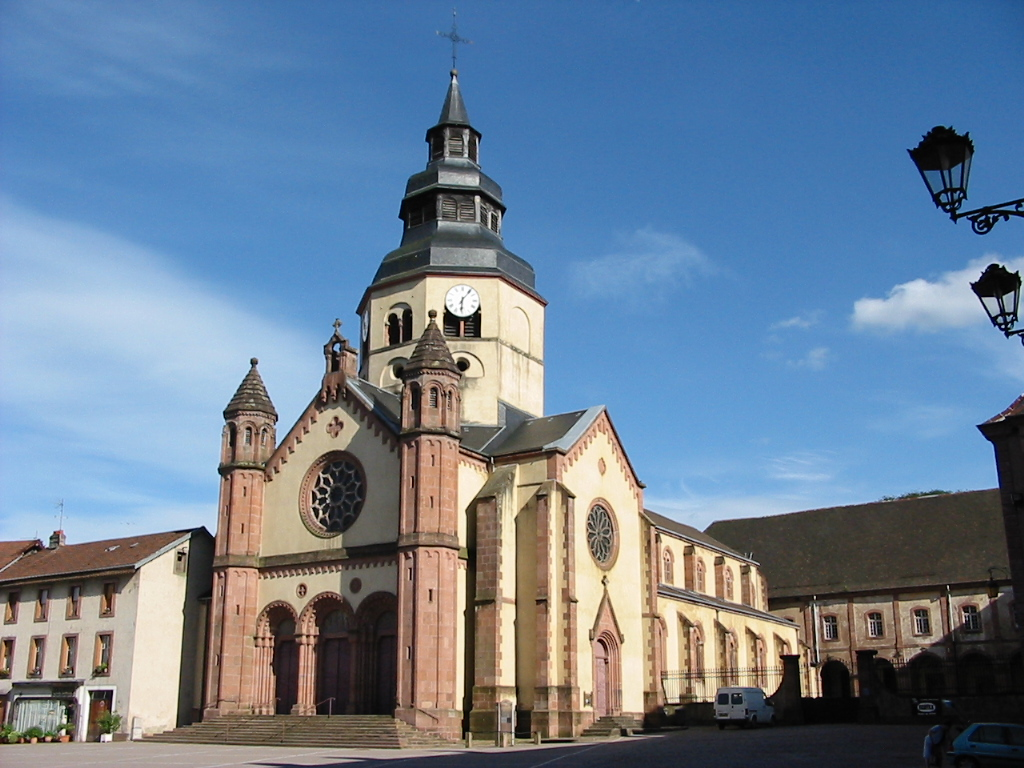
Senones 88 Saint-Gondelbert.jpg

Saint Gondelbert (also Gondelbertus, Gundebert, Gumbert, Gombert, or Gondeberg; Latin: Gumbertus, etc.) was the founder of the Benedictine Senones Abbey in the Rabodeau (fr:Rabodeau) valley of the Vosges mountains around 640 AD.

== Life ==
The life of Saint Gondelbert was written by one Richer, a monk of Senones, composed three later centuries.

The Benedictine monks of Senones Abbey preserved the tradition, dating from the eleventh century, that Gondelbert was the archbishop of Sens before he founded the abbey. Gondelbert arrived in the Rabodeau valley and named his monastery after the diocese of Sens (Senonis in Latin).

In 661, Childeric II, king of Austrasia, donated the Val de Senones to "Gumbertus Episcopus". Childeric's donation was both generous and self-serving. It pleased him to thus oblige a man of God and to favor the extension of the Christian faith in this region. But he also knew that the founding of an abbey would open a center of civilization in the most deprived part of his kingdom.

Gondelbert's first cares was to provide his community with a church, which he dedicated to Notre-Dame. Subsequently, there developed monastic buildings which he placed under the patronage of Saint Peter. The group followed the Rule of Saint Benedict.

He was the confessor of Itta of Metz, and is credited with building the first church in Itteville.

He died around 676 while making a pilgrimage to Moyenvic.

He is a Catholic saint and his feastday is 21 February.

The parish church in Senones is dedicated to St. Gondelbert.
