= Faverney =

- Commune
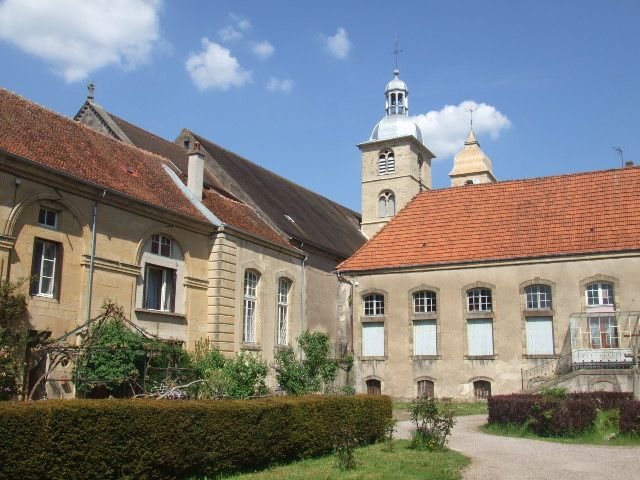
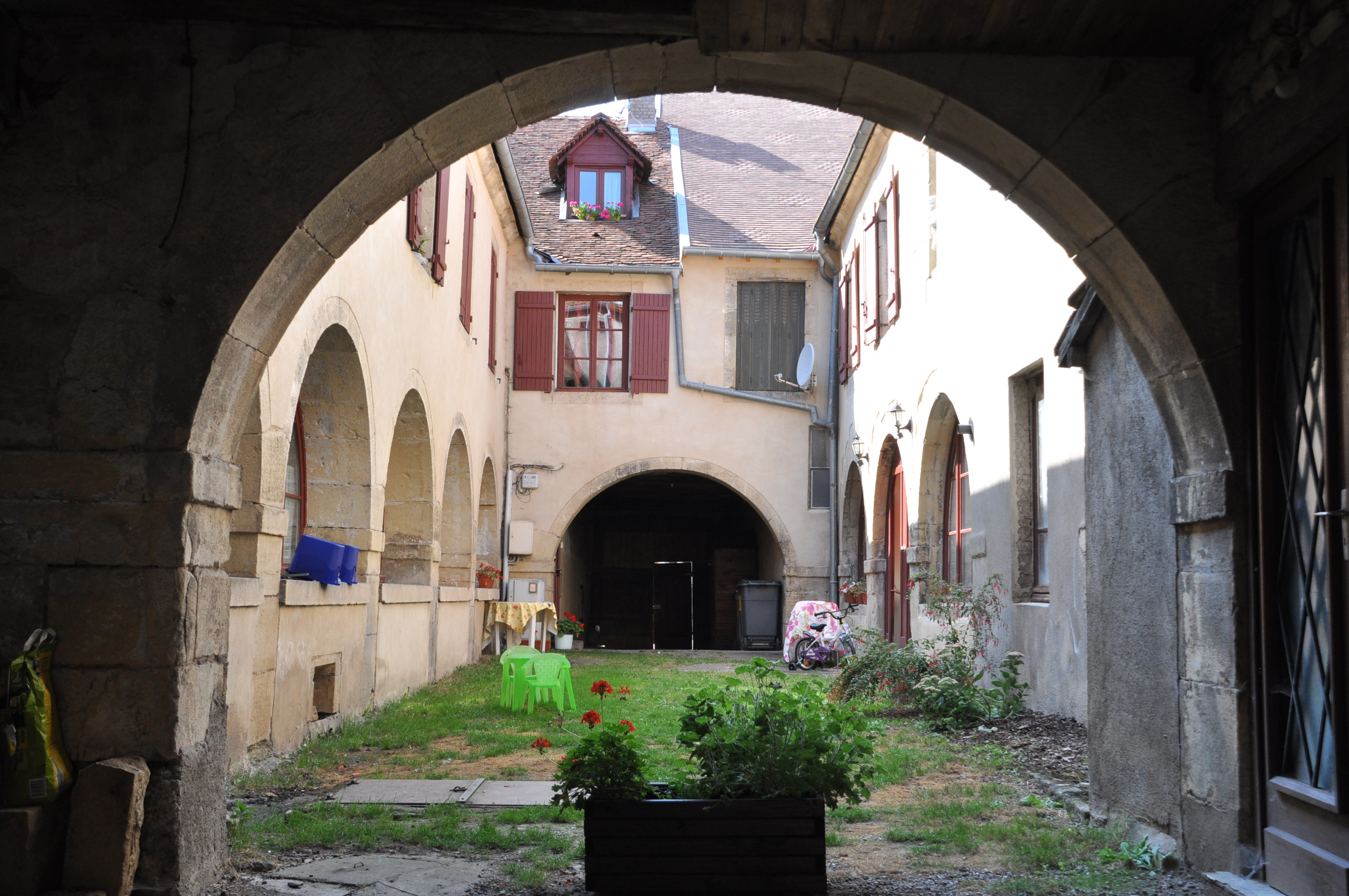
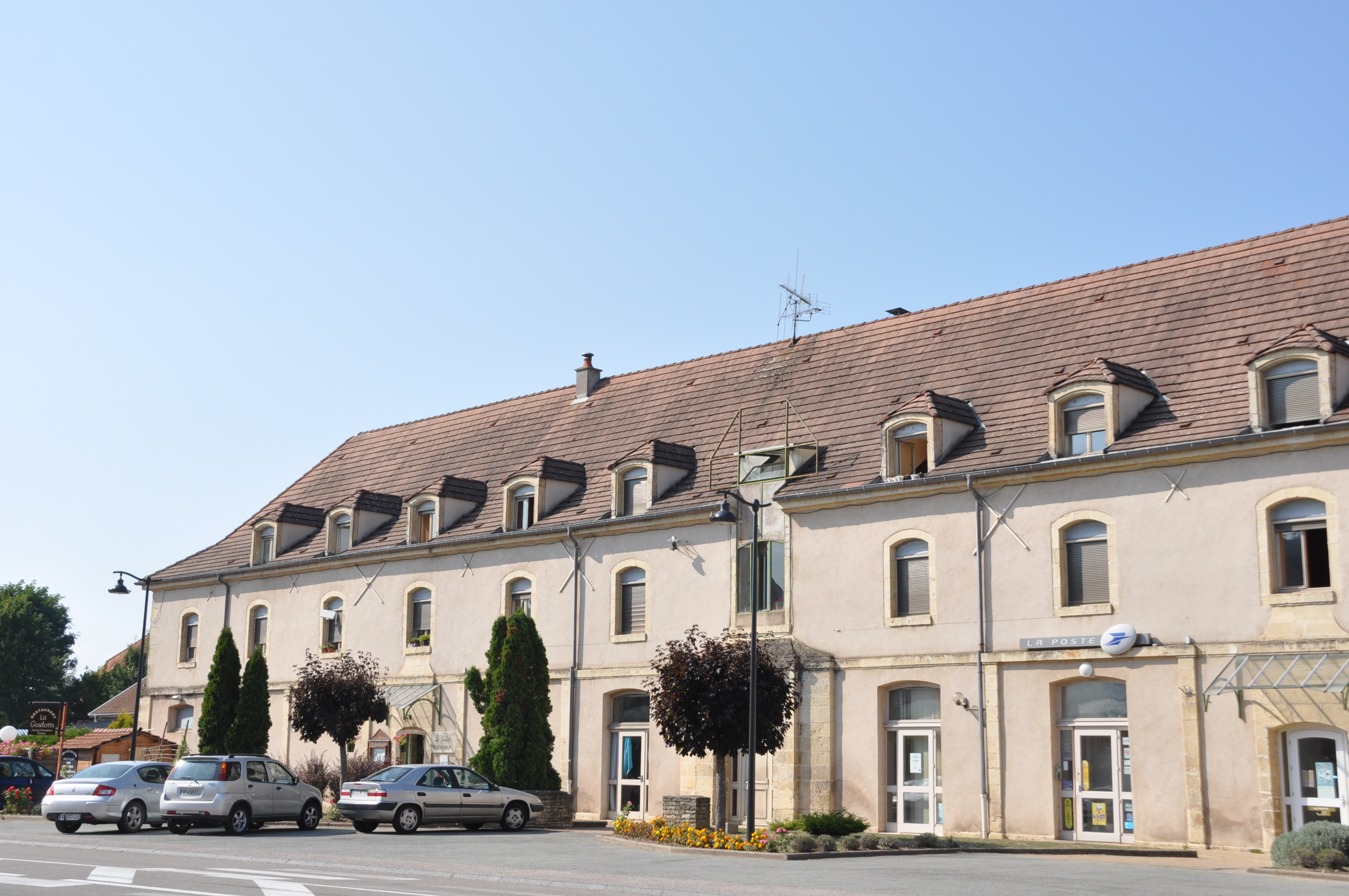
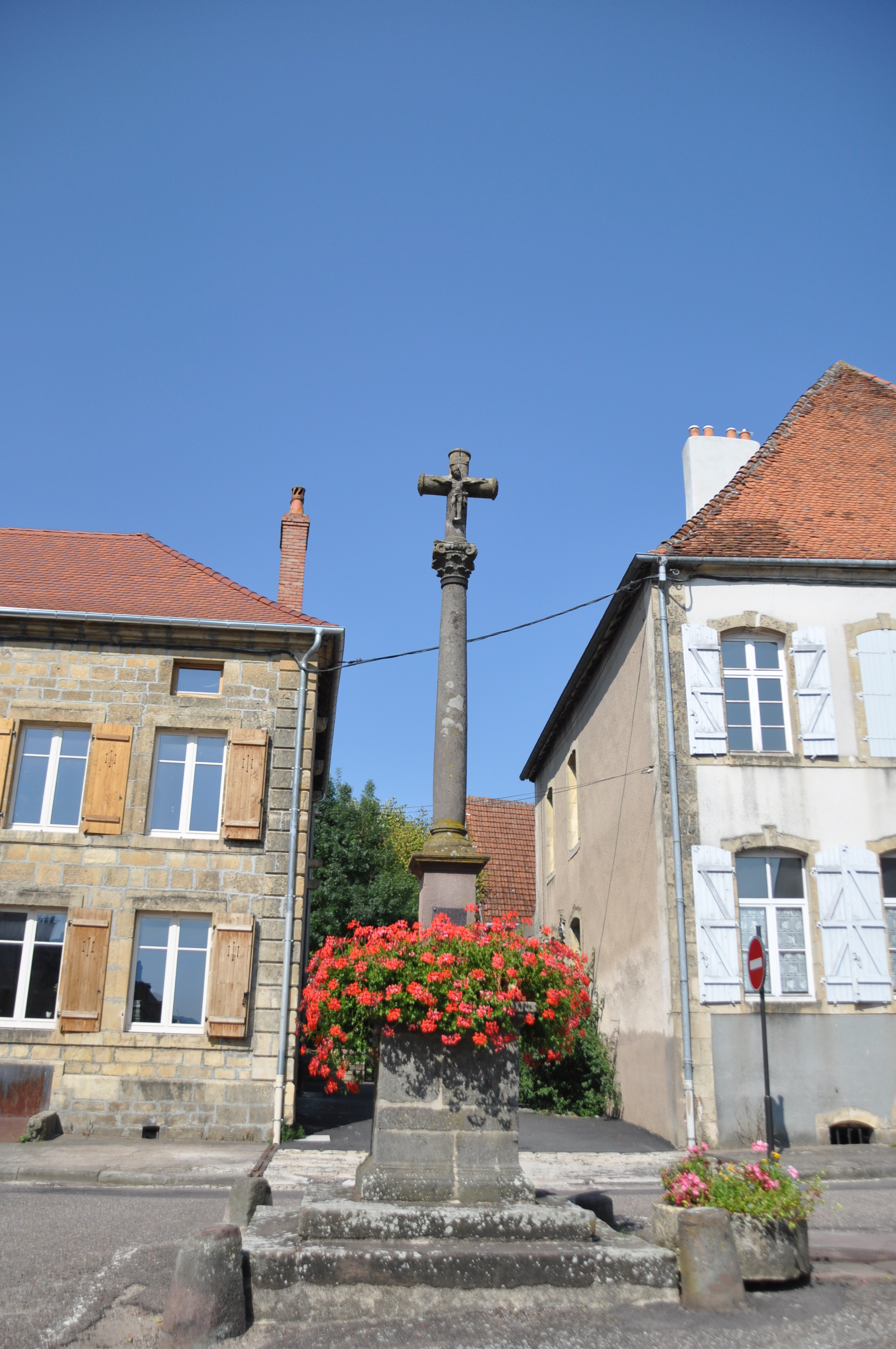
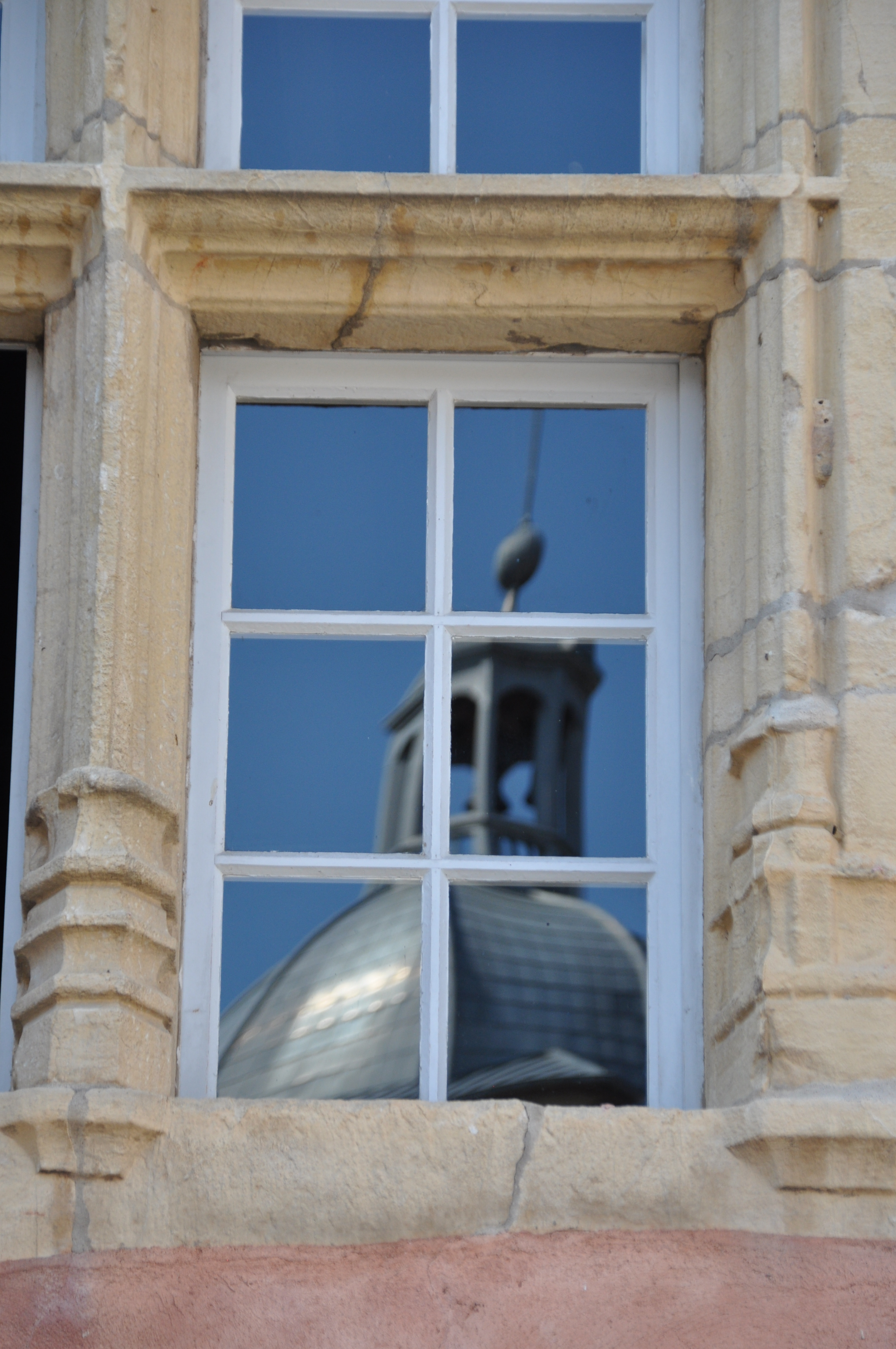
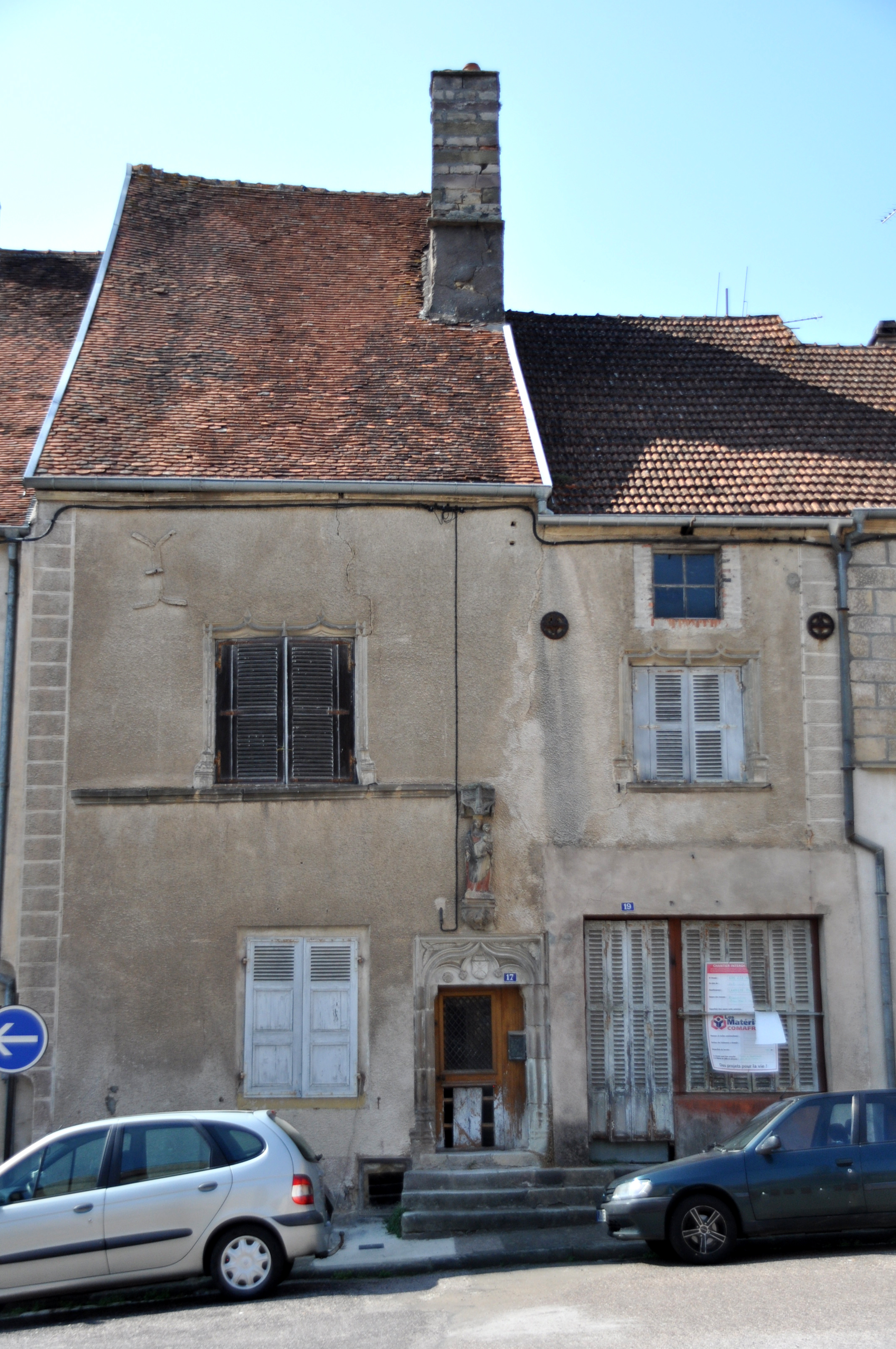
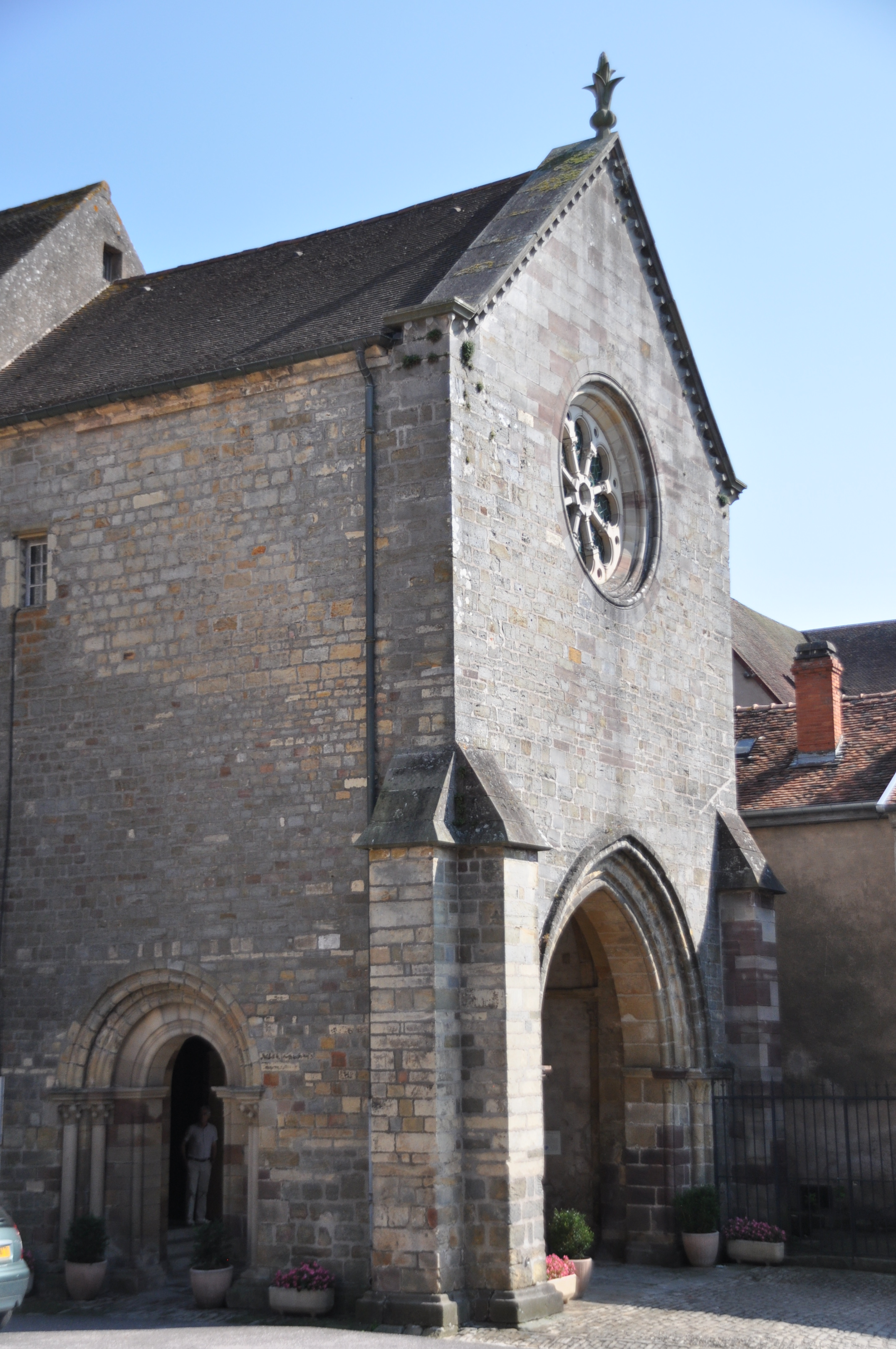
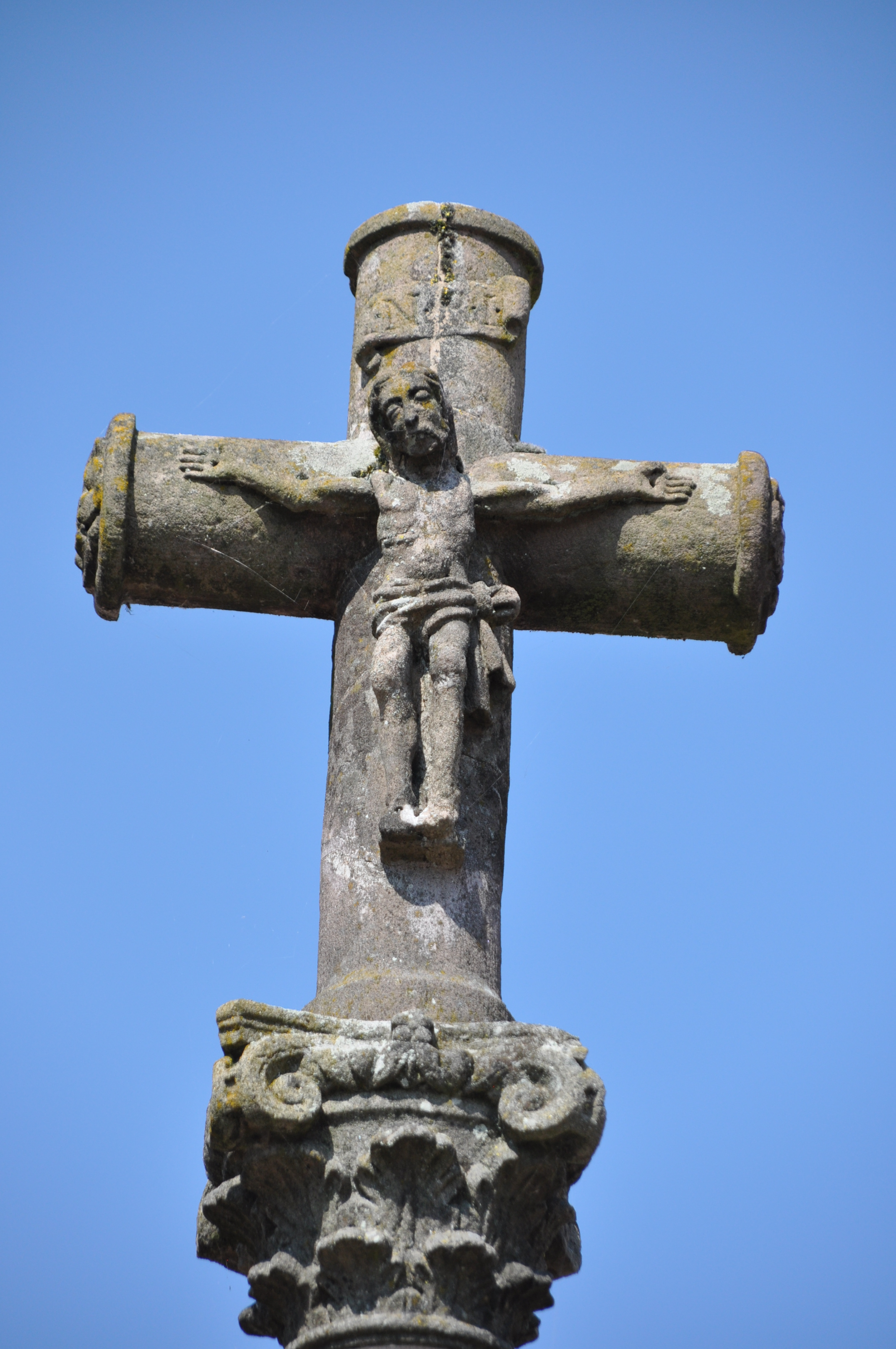

- Coat of arms
- Location of Faverney
- Location within France Location within Bourgogne-Franche-Comté
- Coordinates: 47°46′07″N 6°06′18″E
- Country: France
- Region: Bourgogne-Franche-Comté
- Department: Haute-Saône
- Arrondissement: Vesoul
- Canton: Port-sur-Saône

Government
  - Mayor (2020–2026): François Laurent
- Area^{1}: 18.23 km^{2} (7.04 sq mi)
- Highest elevation: 331 m (1,086 ft)
- Lowest elevation: 209 m (686 ft)
- Population (2023): 980
  - Density: 54/km^{2} (140/sq mi)
- Time zone: UTC+01:00 (CET)
  - Summer (DST): UTC+02:00 (CEST)
- INSEE/Postal code: 70228 /70160
- ^{1} French Land Register data, which excludes lakes, ponds, glaciers > 1 km^{2} (0.386 sq mi or 247 acres) and river estuaries.

Faverney (French pronunciation: [favɛʁnɛ]) is a commune in the Haute-Saône department in the region of Bourgogne-Franche-Comté in eastern France.

== See also ==
- Communes of the Haute-Saône department
