= Lay-Saint-Christophe =

- Commune
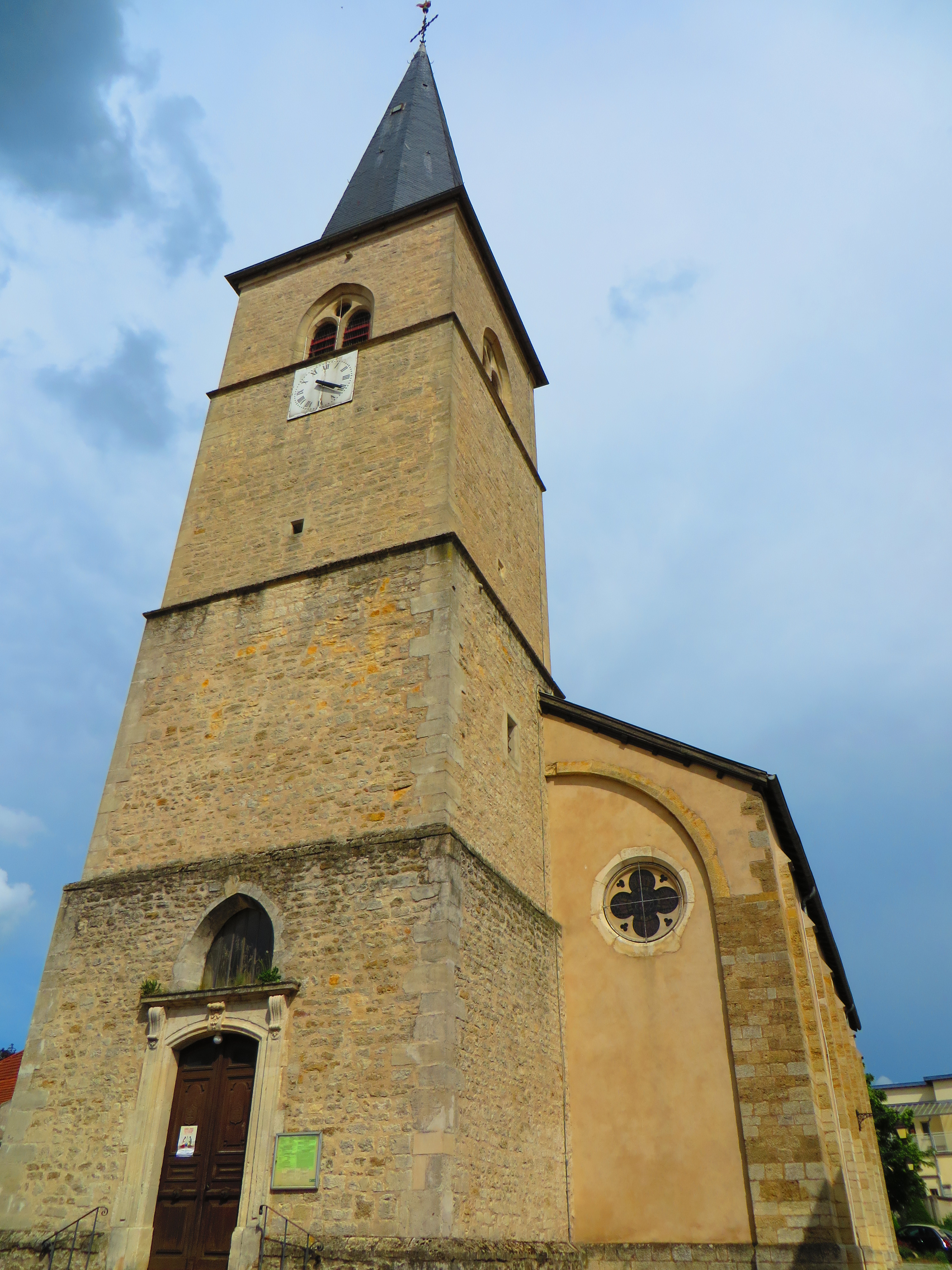
- The church in Lay-Saint-Christophe

- Coat of arms
- Location of Lay-Saint-Christophe
- Location within France Location within Grand Est
- Coordinates: 48°44′56″N 6°12′05″E
- Country: France
- Region: Grand Est
- Department: Meurthe-et-Moselle
- Arrondissement: Nancy
- Canton: Entre Seille et Meurthe
- Intercommunality: CC Bassin de Pompey

Government
  - Mayor (2020–2026): Patrick Medart
- Area^{1}: 11.59 km^{2} (4.47 sq mi)
- Elevation: 200 m (660 ft)
- Highest elevation: 380 m (1,250 ft)
- Lowest elevation: 180 m (590 ft)
- Population (2023): 2,355
  - Density: 203.2/km^{2} (526.3/sq mi)
- Time zone: UTC+01:00 (CET)
  - Summer (DST): UTC+02:00 (CEST)
- INSEE/Postal code: 54305 /54690
- ^{1} French Land Register data, which excludes lakes, ponds, glaciers > 1 km^{2} (0.386 sq mi or 247 acres) and river estuaries.

Lay-Saint-Christophe (French pronunciation: [lɛ sɛ̃ kʁistɔf]) is a commune in the Meurthe-et-Moselle department in north-eastern France.

== Population ==
Historical population
Year	Pop.	±% p.a.
1968	1,969	—
1975	2,033	+0.46%
1982	2,281	+1.66%
1990	2,449	+0.89%
1999	2,622	+0.76%
2007	2,617	−0.02%
2012	2,555	−0.48%
2017	2,441	−0.91%
2023	2,355	−0.60%
Source: INSEE

== See also ==
- Communes of the Meurthe-et-Moselle department
