= Ménil-la-Horgne =

- Commune
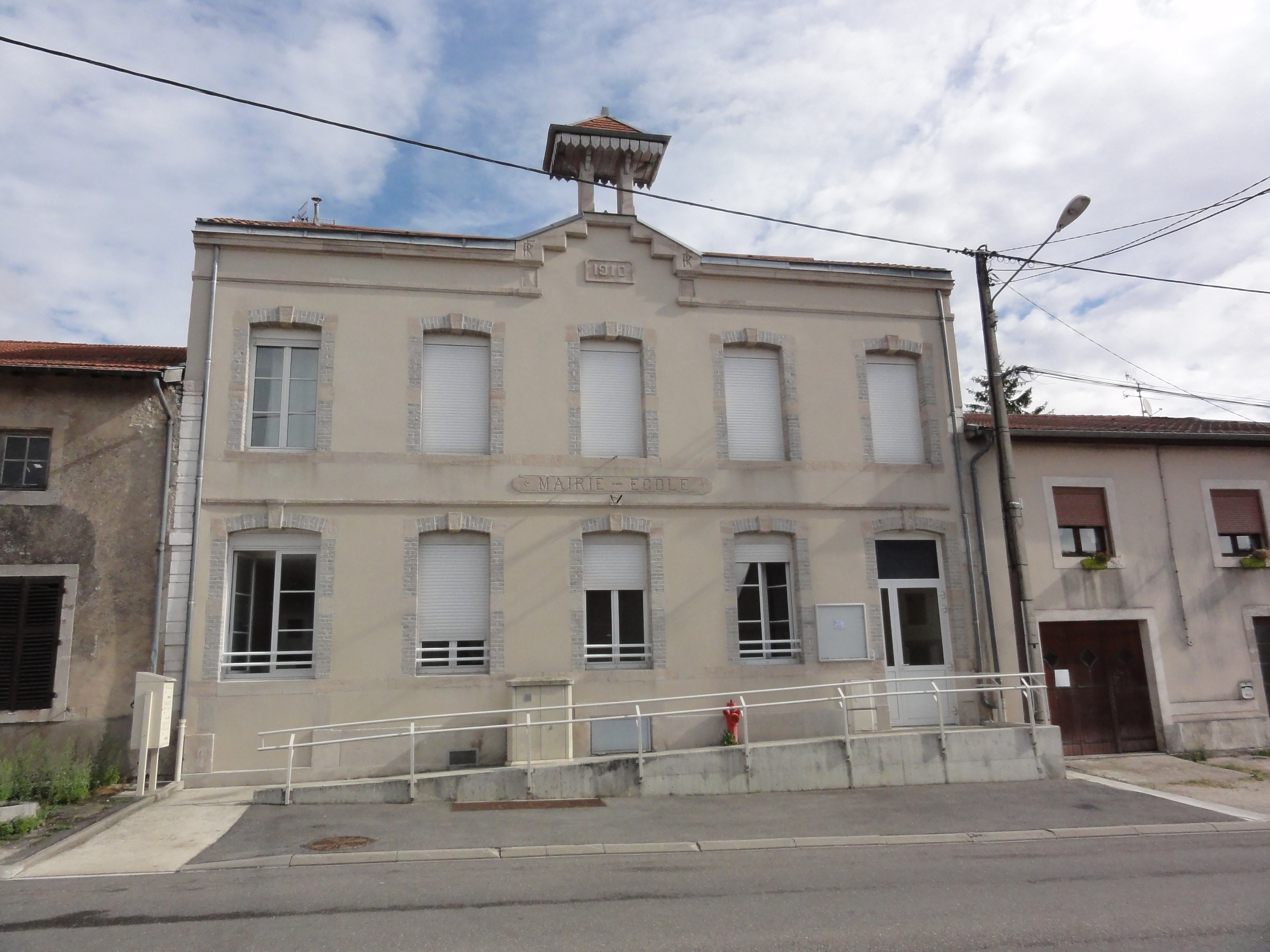
- The town hall in Ménil-la-Horgne

- Coat of arms
- Location of Ménil-la-Horgne
- Location within France Location within Grand Est
- Coordinates: 48°42′15″N 5°31′45″E
- Country: France
- Region: Grand Est
- Department: Meuse
- Arrondissement: Commercy
- Canton: Vaucouleurs

Government
  - Mayor (2020–2026): Claude Kaiser
- Area^{1}: 16.56 km^{2} (6.39 sq mi)
- Elevation: 330 m (1,080 ft)
- Highest elevation: 412 m (1,352 ft)
- Lowest elevation: 260 m (850 ft)
- Population (2023): 180
  - Density: 11/km^{2} (28/sq mi)
- Time zone: UTC+01:00 (CET)
  - Summer (DST): UTC+02:00 (CEST)
- INSEE/Postal code: 55334 /55190
- ^{1} French Land Register data, which excludes lakes, ponds, glaciers > 1 km^{2} (0.386 sq mi or 247 acres) and river estuaries.

Ménil-la-Horgne (French pronunciation: [menil la ɔʁɲ]) is a commune in the Meuse department in Grand Est in north-eastern France.

== See also ==
- Communes of the Meuse department
