= Senones Abbey =

Abbey in Vosges, France

Coordinates: 48°23′37″N 6°58′50″E

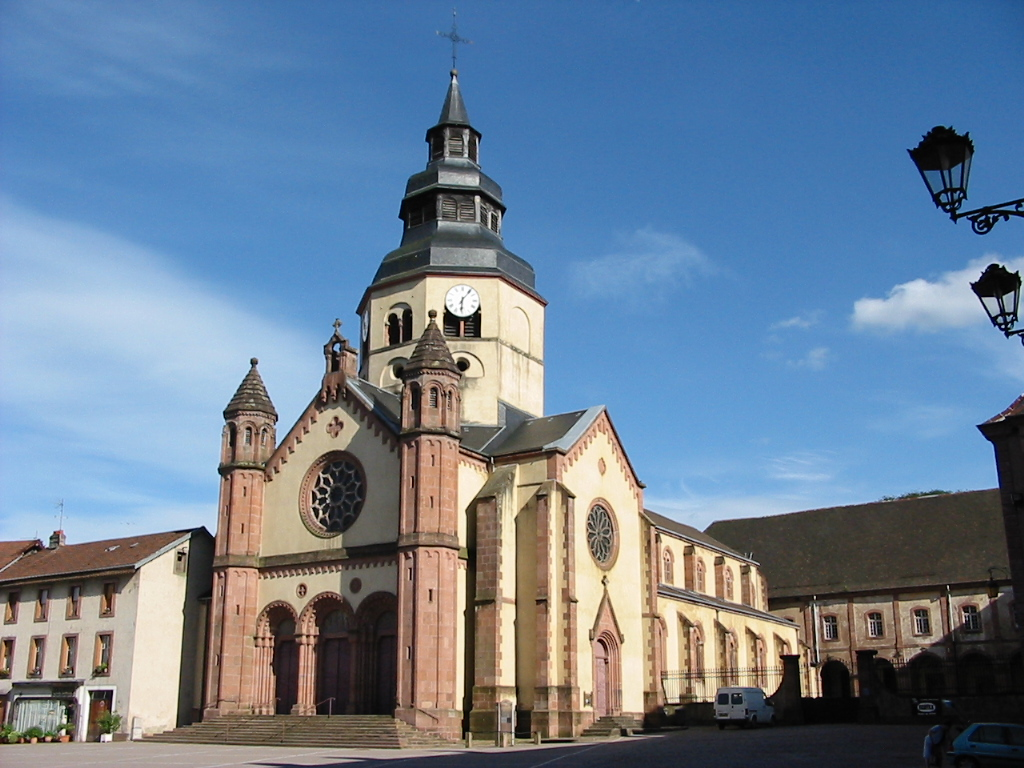
Saint-Gondelbert abbey church

Senones Abbey (Abbaye de Senones) was a Benedictine abbey located in the valley of the Rabodeau, in the present village of Senones in Grand Est, France.

== History ==
The abbey was founded in the middle of the 7th century by Saint Gondelbert, bishop of Sens, who was also the first abbot. Gondelbert arrived in the Rabodeau valley and named his monastery after the diocese of Sens (Senonis in Latin). In 661, Childeric II, king of Austrasia, donated the Val de Senones to Gondelbert, who dedicated the church to Notre Dame. The monks followed the Rule of Saint Benedict.

The Vögte ("advocates"), from at the latest the 12th century, were the Counts, later Princes, of Salm, in whose lands the abbey stood. There was frequent conflict between the abbey and its Vögte up the end of the monastery's existence. In the 16th century however the conflicts became so severe that to resolve them required the intervention of Emperor Maximilian II and Popes Pius V and Gregory XIII; the resolution was not to the advantage of the abbey, which found itself from then on significantly weakened in relation to the claims of the Salms.

In the 12th century the abbey premises were rebuilt by abbot Anthony of Pavia, and included a round church, now vanished. At this time the abbey was responsible for the foundation of several small priories, including those at Xures, Léomont and Vic-sur-Seille (all in the first third of the century), Le Moniet (1126) and Fricourt (in the mid-12th century). The priory at Mervaville was a later foundation of the abbey, from the first quarter of the 13th century.

The abbey was the home during the first half of the 13th century of the monk and chronicler Richer of Senones. He started to write his Gesta Senoniensis ecclesiae shortly after 1254 and continued his account up to 1264.

The reform of the Congregation of St. Vanne was introduced in 1618.

Dom Antoine Calmet, famed for his extensive commentaries on the Bible, and author of other works including a history of Lorraine, was elected abbot in 1729. (He also left a history of the abbey in manuscript). Voltaire was an admirer of the abbot, and stayed at Senones Abbey in 1754. Dom Calmet assembled a library of 15,000 volumes, and rebuilt the entire complex.

On 2 March 1793 the Principality of Salm was incorporated into the newly formed department of Vosges and at that time the abbey was dissolved.

== Buildings ==
The abbey's assets were sold off as national property. The buildings were bought by local industrialists who used them for textile works, which is what they remained until 1993, when they were acquired for preservation.

The buildings on the site today are all from the 18th century rebuilding under Dom Calmet, except for (a) the church, a 19th-century reconstruction apart from its bell tower, which is the only structure on the whole site remaining from the 12th century, and (b) the individual houses to the north, also 19th century, which stand on the sites of the old mill and a farm building.

The abbey has been listed as a Monument historique by the French Ministry of Culture since 1983.

== Sources ==
- Vosges-Archives.com: History of the abbey (in French)
- Paysdesabbayes.com: Senones (in French)
