= Val-et-Châtillon =

- Commune
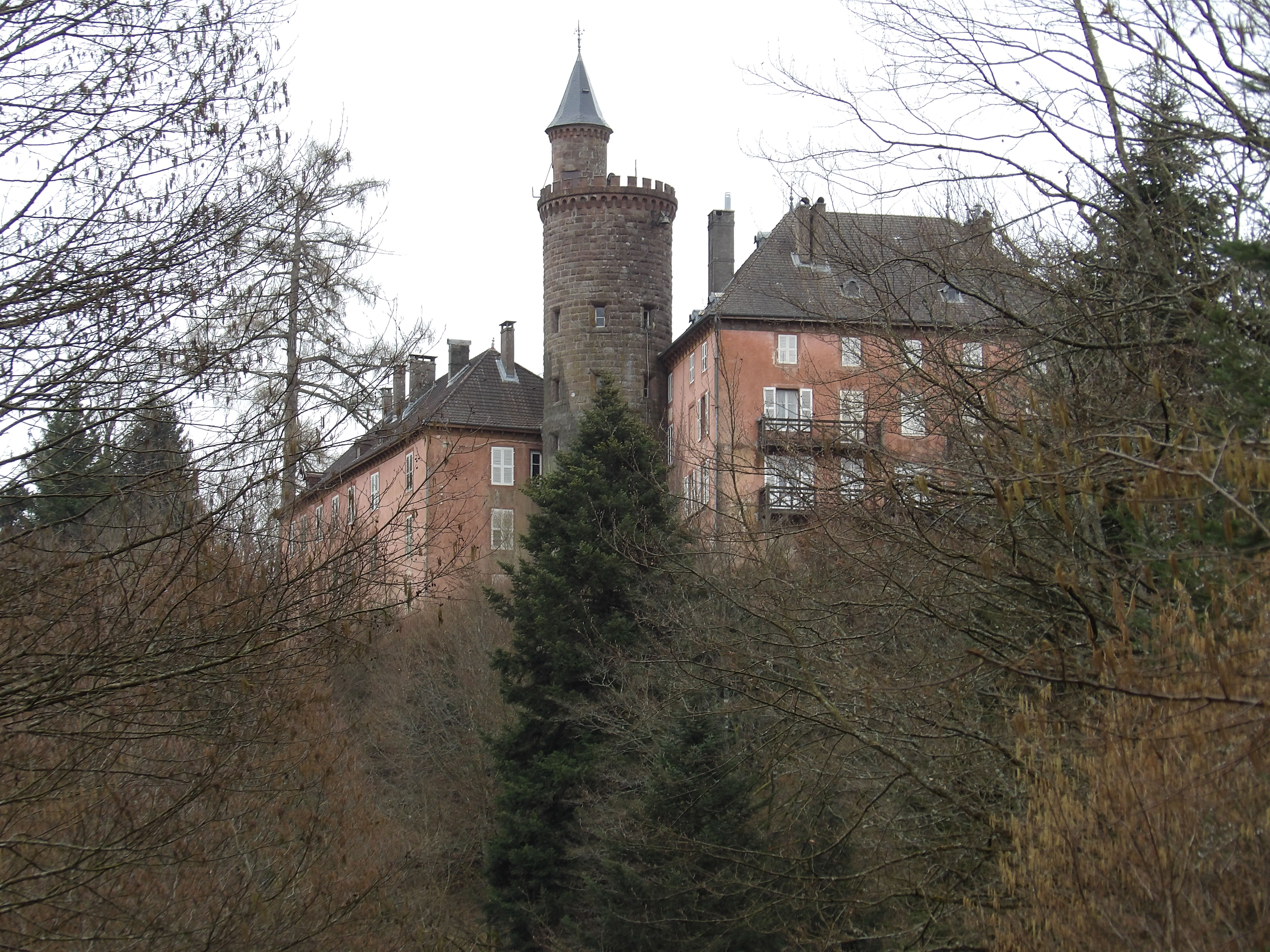
- The chateau in Val-et-Châtillon

- Coat of arms
- Location of Val-et-Châtillon
- Location within France Location within Grand Est
- Coordinates: 48°33′34″N 6°58′01″E
- Country: France
- Region: Grand Est
- Department: Meurthe-et-Moselle
- Arrondissement: Lunéville
- Canton: Baccarat
- Intercommunality: CC de Vezouze en Piémont

Government
  - Mayor (2020–2026): Thierry Culmet
- Area^{1}: 18.57 km^{2} (7.17 sq mi)
- Elevation: 310 m (1,020 ft)
- Highest elevation: 670 m (2,200 ft)
- Lowest elevation: 295 m (968 ft)
- Population (2023): 552
  - Density: 29.7/km^{2} (77.0/sq mi)
- Time zone: UTC+01:00 (CET)
  - Summer (DST): UTC+02:00 (CEST)
- INSEE/Postal code: 54540 /54480
- ^{1} French Land Register data, which excludes lakes, ponds, glaciers > 1 km^{2} (0.386 sq mi or 247 acres) and river estuaries.

Val-et-Châtillon (French pronunciation: [val e ʃatijɔ̃]) is a commune in the Meurthe-et-Moselle department in north-eastern France.

== See also ==
- Communes of the Meurthe-et-Moselle department
