= Besançon =

Prefecture and commune in Bourgogne-Franche-Comté, France

- Prefecture and commune
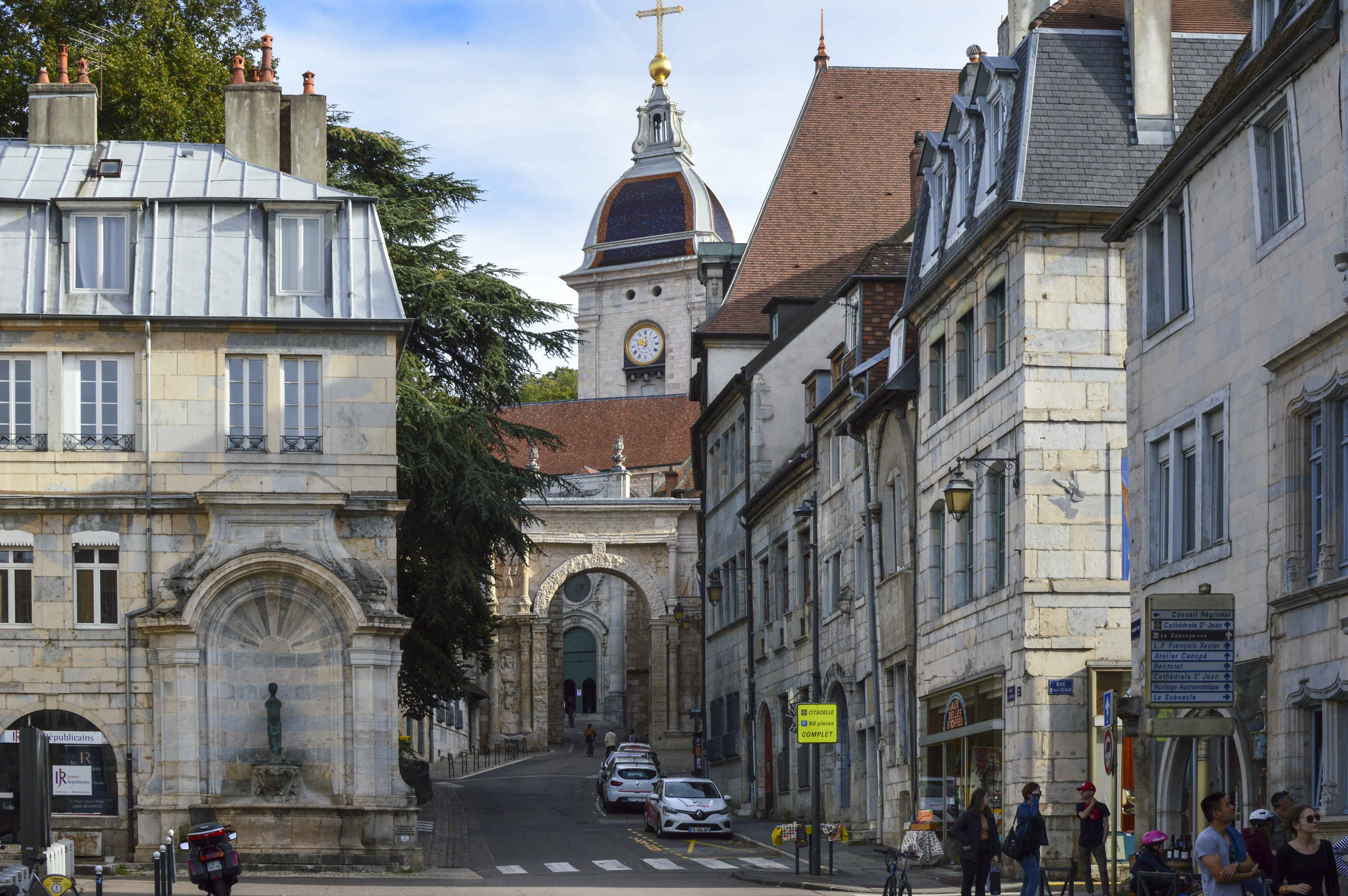
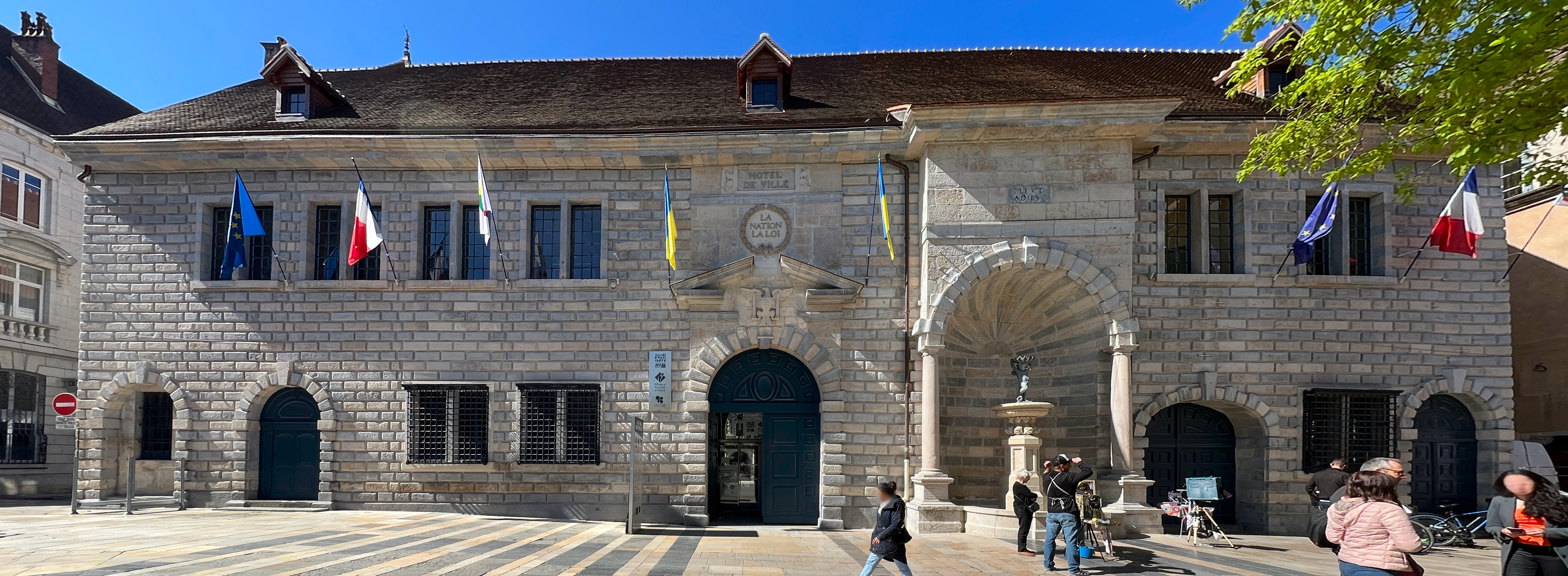
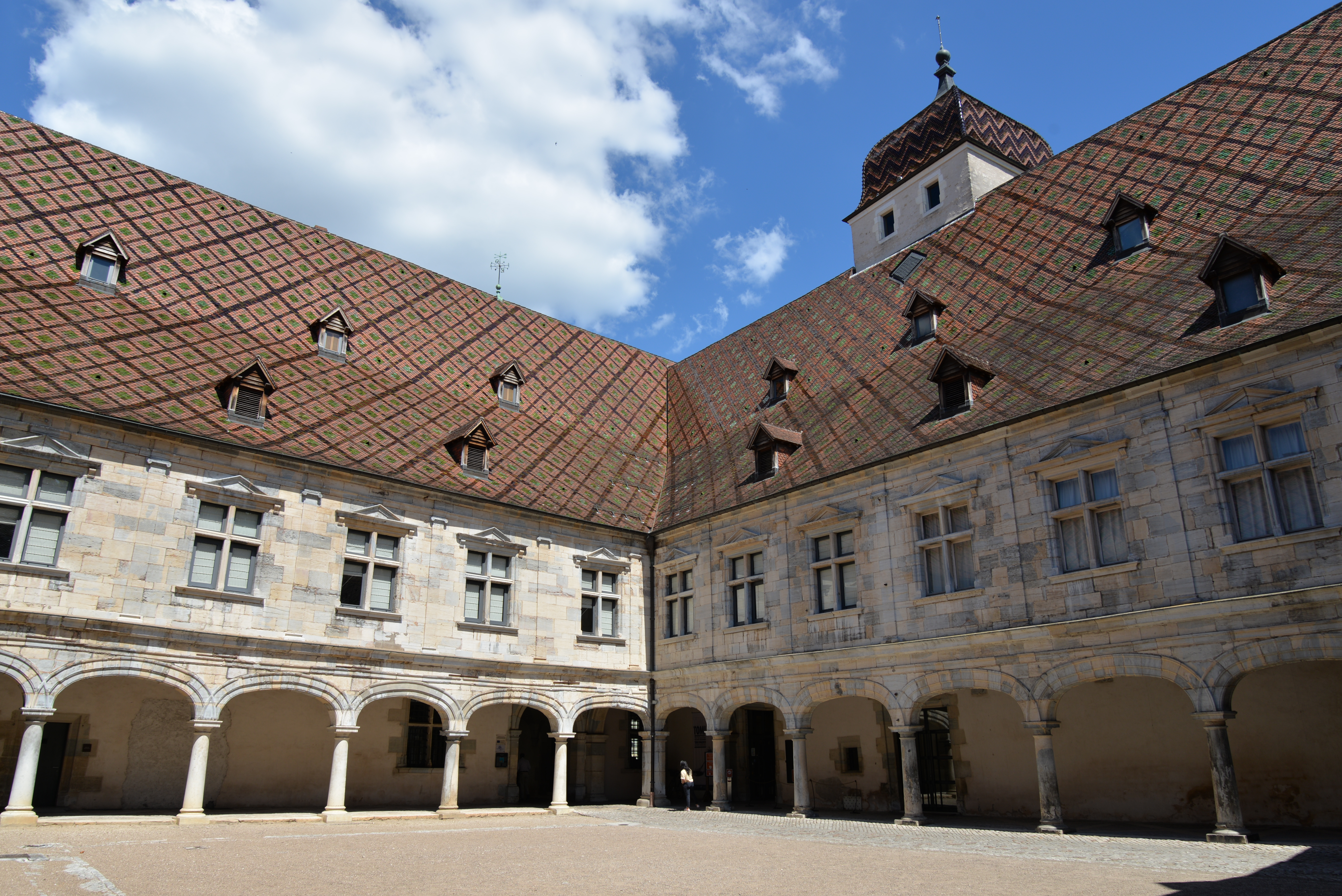
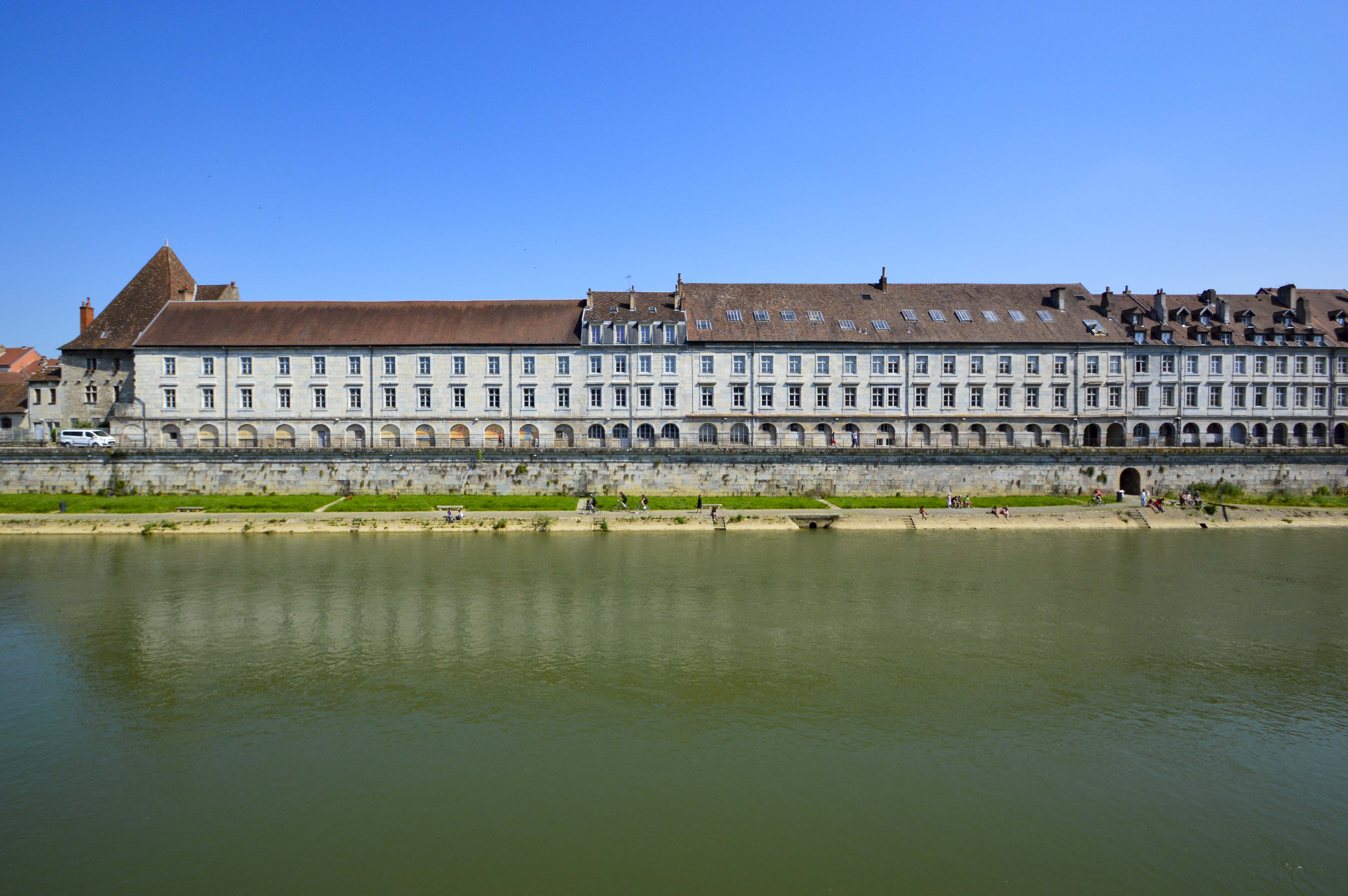
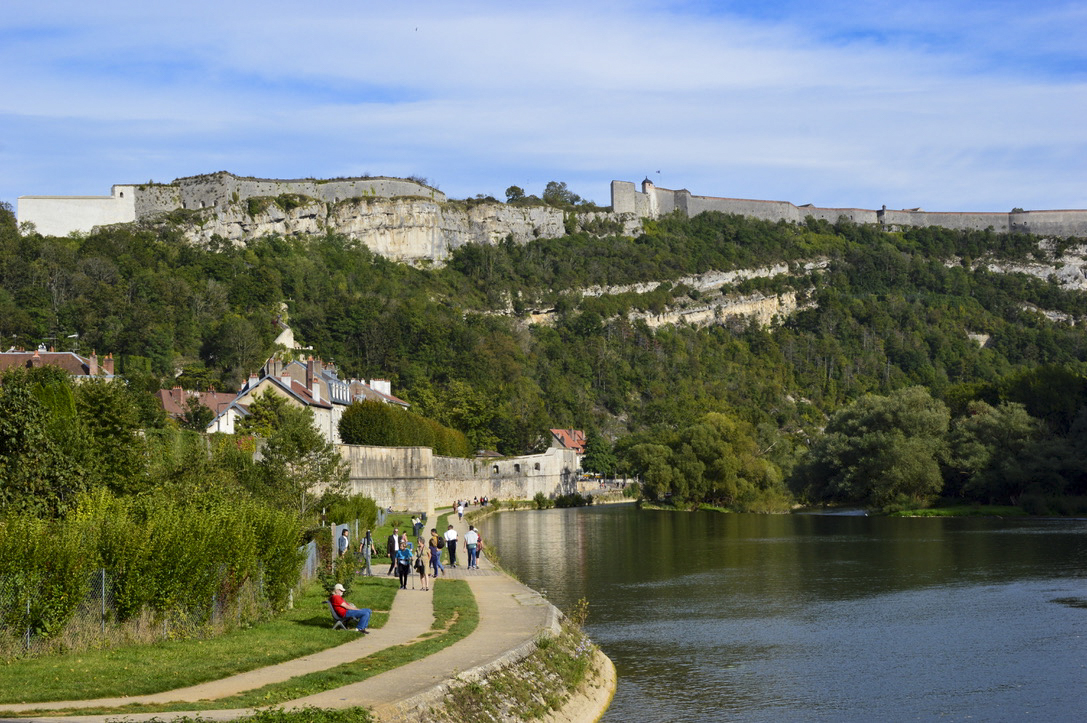
- Left to right, top to bottom: the Saint-Jean district with the Porte Noire and the cathedral, the Hôtel de Ville, the Granvelle Palace, Quai Vauban, citadel above the river Doubs.

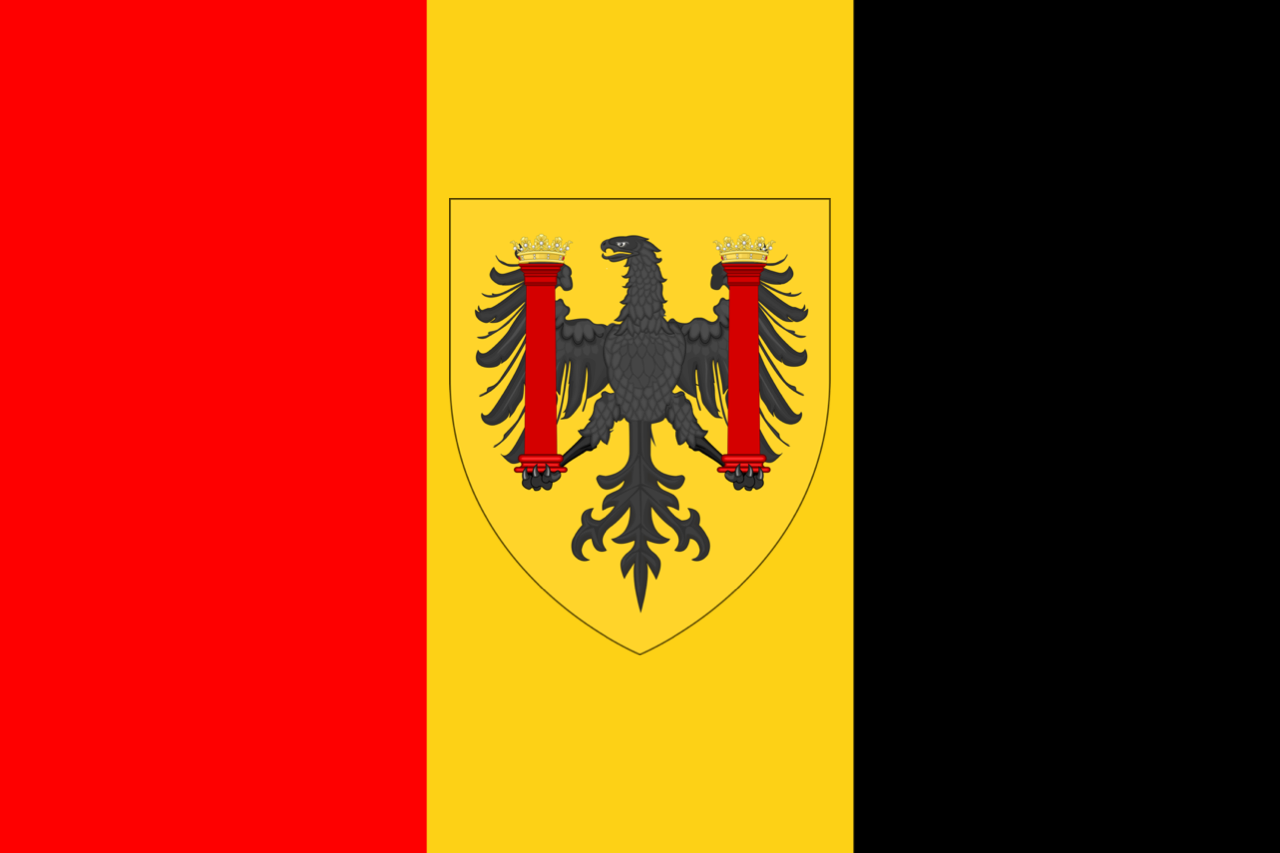
- Flag Coat of arms
- Motto: Plût A Dieu ("If God wills") or Utinam
- Location of Besançon
- Location within France Location within Bourgogne-Franche-Comté
- Coordinates: 47°14′24″N 6°1′12″E
- Country: France
- Region: Bourgogne-Franche-Comté
- Department: Doubs
- Arrondissement: Besançon
- Canton: Besançon-1, 2, 3, 4, 5 and 6
- Intercommunality: Grand Besançon Métropole

Government
  - Mayor (2026–32): Ludovic Fagaut
- Area^{1}: 65.05 km^{2} (25.12 sq mi)
  - Urban (2022): 528.6 km^{2} (204.1 sq mi)
  - Metro (2022): 2,514.5 km^{2} (970.9 sq mi)
- Population (2023): 118,489
  - Rank: 34th in France
  - Density: 1,822/km^{2} (4,718/sq mi)
  - Urban (2022): 198,387
  - Urban density: 375.3/km^{2} (972.0/sq mi)
  - Metro (2022): 284,474
  - Metro density: 113.13/km^{2} (293.01/sq mi)
- Time zone: UTC+01:00 (CET)
  - Summer (DST): UTC+02:00 (CEST)
- INSEE/Postal code: 25056 /25000
- Website: www.besancon.fr
- ^{1} French Land Register data, which excludes lakes, ponds, glaciers > 1 km^{2} (0.386 sq mi or 247 acres) and river estuaries.

Besançon (UK: /ˈbɛzənsɒn/, US: /bəˈzænsən/; French: [bəzɑ̃sɔ̃], Franco-Provençal: [bəzɑ̃ˈsɔ̃]; archaic German: Bisanz; Latin: Vesontio) is a French city that serves as the capital of the department of Doubs in the region of Bourgogne-Franche-Comté. The city is located in Eastern France, close to the Jura Mountains and the border with Switzerland.

Capital of the historic and cultural region of Franche-Comté, Besançon is home to the Bourgogne-Franche-Comté regional council headquarters, and is an important administrative centre in the region. It is also the seat of one of the fifteen French ecclesiastical provinces and one of the two divisions of the French Army.

The city has a population of about 120,000, and is the centre of a metropolitan area of about 285,000 inhabitants, the second in the region in terms of population (after Dijon).

Established in a meander of the river Doubs, the city was already important during the Gallo-Roman era under the name of Vesontio, capital of the Sequani. Its geography and specific history turned it into a military stronghold, a garrison city, a political centre, and a religious capital.

Besançon is the historical capital of watchmaking in France. This has led it to become a centre for innovative companies in the fields of microtechnology, micromechanics, and biomedical engineering. Its university, founded in 1423, has an enrollment of nearly 30,000 students, including around 4,000 trainees from all over the world within its Centre for Applied Linguistics (CLA).

The greenest city in France, it enjoys a quality of life recognized in Europe. Thanks to its rich historical and cultural heritage and its unique architecture, Besançon has been labeled a "Town of Art and History" since 1986. Its fortifications, designed by Vauban, have been listed as a UNESCO World Heritage Site since 2008. The city has preserved numerous historical elements dating from Antiquity to the 19th century.

== History ==
=== Toponymy ===
The city is first recorded in 58 BC as Vesontio in Book I of Julius Caesar's Commentarii de Bello Gallico. The etymology of Vesontio is uncertain. The most common explanation is that the name is of Celtic origin, derived from wes, meaning 'mountain'. During the 4th century, the letter B took the place of the V, and the city name changed to Besontio or Bisontion and then underwent several transformations to become Besançon in 1243.

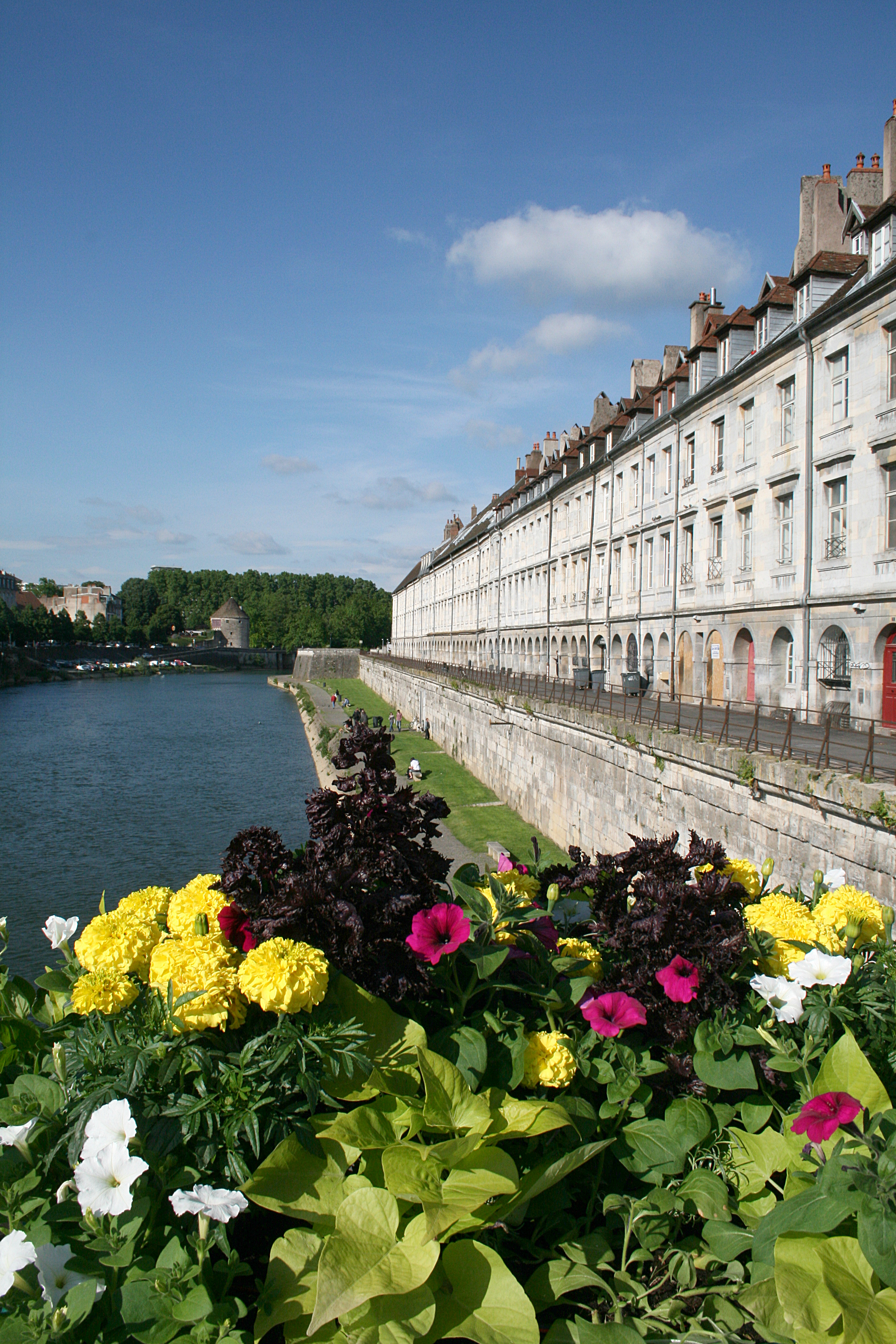
The Doubs and the Quai Vauban seen from the Pont Battant.

=== Ancient history ===
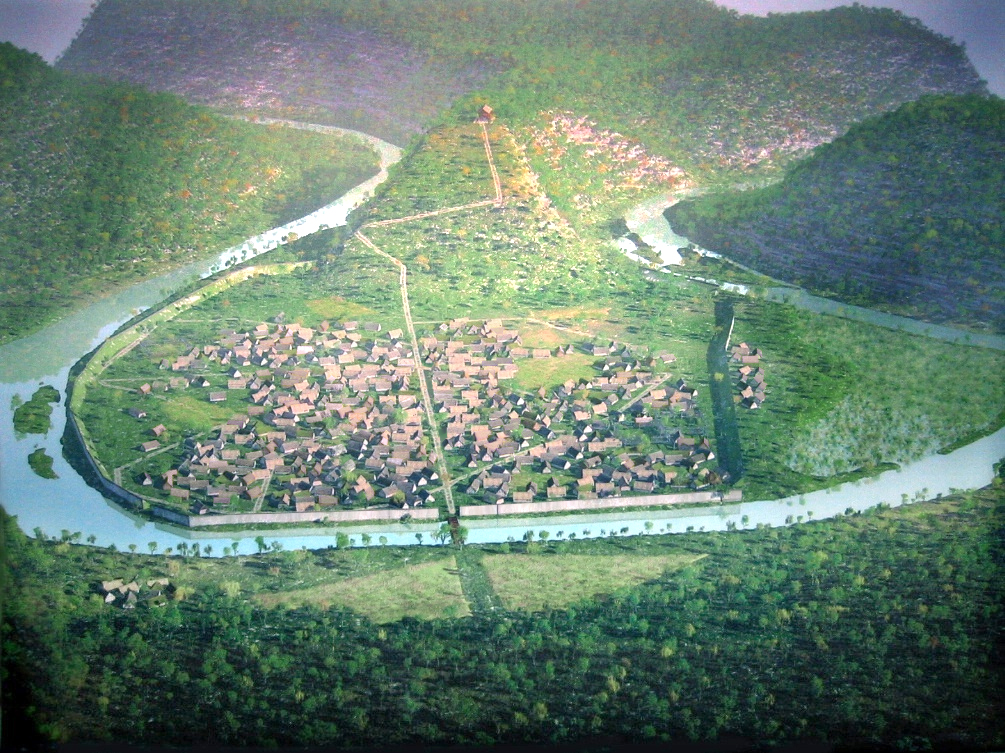
Reconstruction of the Gallic (pre-Roman) oppidum of Vesontio

The city sits within an oxbow of the river Doubs (a tributary of the Saône); a mountain closes the fourth side. During the Bronze Age, c. 1500 BC, tribes of Gauls settled the oxbow.

From the 1st century BC through the modern era, the town had a significant military importance because the Alps rise abruptly to its immediate south, presenting a significant natural barrier.

The Arar (Saône) River formed part of the border between the Haedui and their hereditary rivals, the Sequani. According to Strabo, the cause of the conflict was commercial. Each tribe claimed the Arar and the tolls on trade along it. The Sequani controlled access to the Rhine and had built an oppidum (a fortified town) at Vesontio to protect their interests. The Sequani defeated and massacred the Haedui at the Battle of Magetobriga, with the help of the Arverni tribe and the Germanic Suebi tribe under the Germanic king Ariovistus.

Julius Caesar, in his commentaries detailing his conquest of Gaul, describes Vesontio (possibly Latinized), as the largest town of the Sequani, a smaller Gaulic tribe, and mentions that a wooden palisade surrounded it. It appears as Vesontine in the Tabula Peutingeriana.

Over the centuries, the name permutated to become Besantio, Besontion, Bisanz in Middle High German, and gradually arrived at the modern French Besançon. The locals retain their ancient heritage referring to themselves as Bisontins (feminine: Bisontine).

It has been an archbishopric since the 4th century.

=== Middle Ages ===
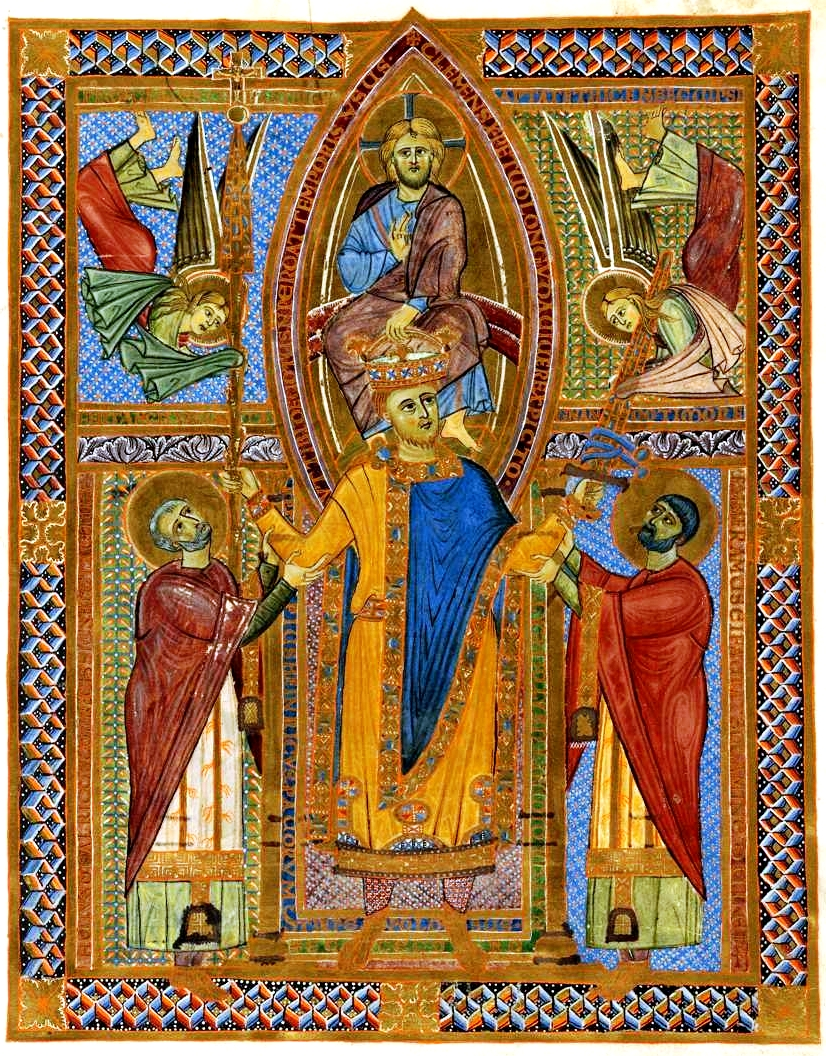
Henry II, Holy Roman Emperor inherited the city and made it part of the Holy Roman Empire in 1032.

In 843, the Treaty of Verdun divided up Charlemagne's empire. Besançon became part of Lotharingia, under the Duke of Burgundy.

As part of the Holy Roman Empire since 1034, the city became an archbishopric, and was designated the Free Imperial City of Besançon (an autonomous city-state under the Holy Roman Emperor) in 1184. In 1157, Emperor Frederick Barbarossa held the Diet of Besançon. There, Cardinal Orlando Bandinelli (the future Pope Alexander III, then adviser of Pope Adrian IV) openly asserted before the Emperor that the imperial dignity was a papal beneficium (in the more general sense of favour, not the strict feudal sense of fief), which incurred the wrath of the German princes. He would have fallen on the spot under the battle-axe of his lifelong foe, Otto of Wittelsbach, had Frederick not intervened. The Archbishops were elevated to Princes of the Holy Roman Empire in 1288. The close connection to the Empire is reflected in the city's coat of arms.

In 1290, after a century of fighting against the power of the archbishops, the Emperor granted Besançon its independence.

=== Renaissance ===
In the 15th century, Besançon came under the influence of the dukes of Burgundy. After the marriage of Mary of Burgundy to Maximilian I, Holy Roman Emperor, the city was in effect a Habsburg fief. In 1519, King Charles I of Spain became Holy Roman Emperor (as Charles V). This made him master of the Franche-Comté and Besançon, a francophone imperial city. In 1526 the city obtained the right to mint coins, which it continued to strike until 1673. Nevertheless, all coins bore the name of Charles V.

When Charles V abdicated in 1555, he gave the Franche-Comté to his son, Philip II, King of Spain. Besançon remained a free imperial city under the protection of the King of Spain. In 1598, Philip II gave the province to his daughter on her marriage to an Austrian archduke. It remained formally a portion of the Empire until its cession at the peace of Westphalia in 1648. Spain regained control of Franche-Comté and the city lost its status as a free city. Then in 1667, Louis XIV claimed the province as a consequence of his marriage to Marie-Thérèse of Spain in the War of Devolution.

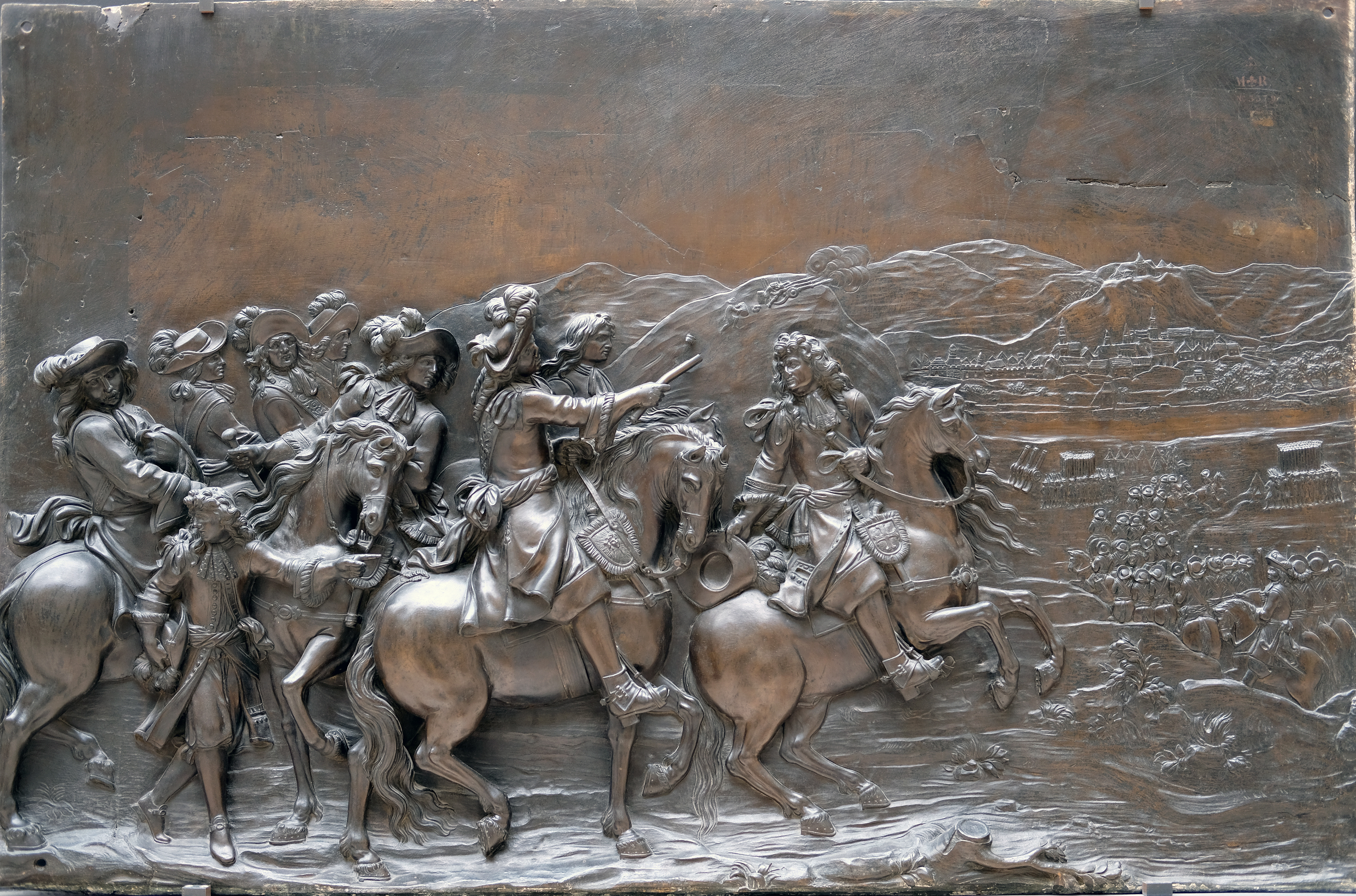
Bas-relief The Conquest of Franche-Comté, by Martin Desjardins (Louvre Museum); in the background, the city of Besançon.

Louis conquered the city for the first time in 1668, but the Treaty of Aix-la-Chapelle returned it to Spain within a matter of months. While it was in French hands, the famed military engineer Vauban visited the city and drew up plans for its fortification. The Spaniards built the main centre point of the city's defences, "la Citadelle", siting it on Mont Saint-Étienne, which closes the neck of the oxbow that is the site of the original town. In their construction, the Spaniards followed Vauban's designs.

In 1674, French troops recaptured the city, which the Treaty of Nijmegen (1678) then awarded to France. At this time the city became the administrative centre for the Franche-Comté, with its own Parlement of Besançon, which replaced Dole.

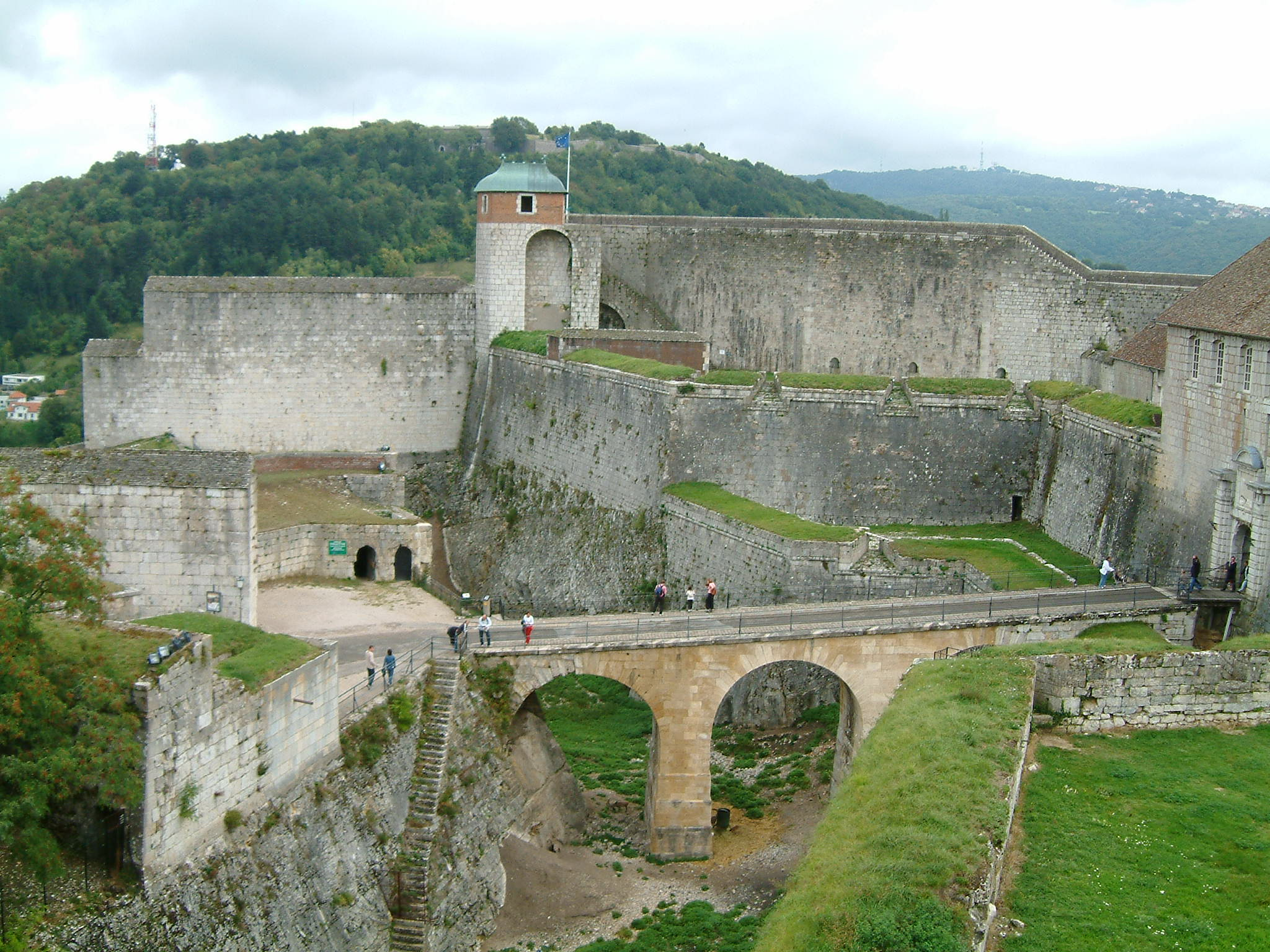
The Citadel of Besançon by Vauban

As a result of control passing to France, Vauban returned to working on the citadel's fortifications, and those of the city. This process lasted until 1711, some 30 years, and the walls built then surround the city. Between the train station and the central city there is a complex moat system that now serves road traffic. Numerous forts, some of which date back to that time and that incorporate Vauban's designs elements sit on the six hills that surround the city: Fort de Trois Châtels, Fort Chaudanne, Fort du Petit Chaudanne, Fort Griffon, Fort des Justices, Fort de Beauregard and Fort de Brégille. The citadel itself has two dry moats, with an outer and inner court. In the evenings, the illuminated Citadelle stands above the city as a landmark and a testament to Vauban's genius as a military engineer.

=== Modern Europe ===
In 1814, the Austrians invaded and bombarded the city. It also occupied an important position during the Franco-Prussian War of 1870–71. In 1871, a project of Besançon Commune is engaged.

The Nazis occupied the citadel during World War II. Between 1940 and 1944, the Germans executed some one hundred French resistance fighters there. However, Besançon saw little action during the war. The allies bombed the railway complex in 1943, and the next year the Germans resisted the U.S. advance for four days.

Besançon was also the location, between 1940 and 1941, of an Internment Camp (Konzentrationslager), Frontstalag 142, also known as Caserne Vauban, which the Germans set up for 3–4,000 holders of British passports, all women and children. The conditions were harsh; many hundreds of internees died of pneumonia, diarrhea, food poisoning, dysentery, and frostbite.

In 1959, the French Army turned the citadel over to the city of Besançon, which turned it into a museum.

The forts of Brégille and Beauregard sit across the Doubs from the city. In 1913, a private company built a funicular to the Brégille Heights. The funicular passed from private ownership to the SNCF, who finally closed it in 1987. The funicular's tracks, stations and even road signs remain in place to this day.

== Geography ==
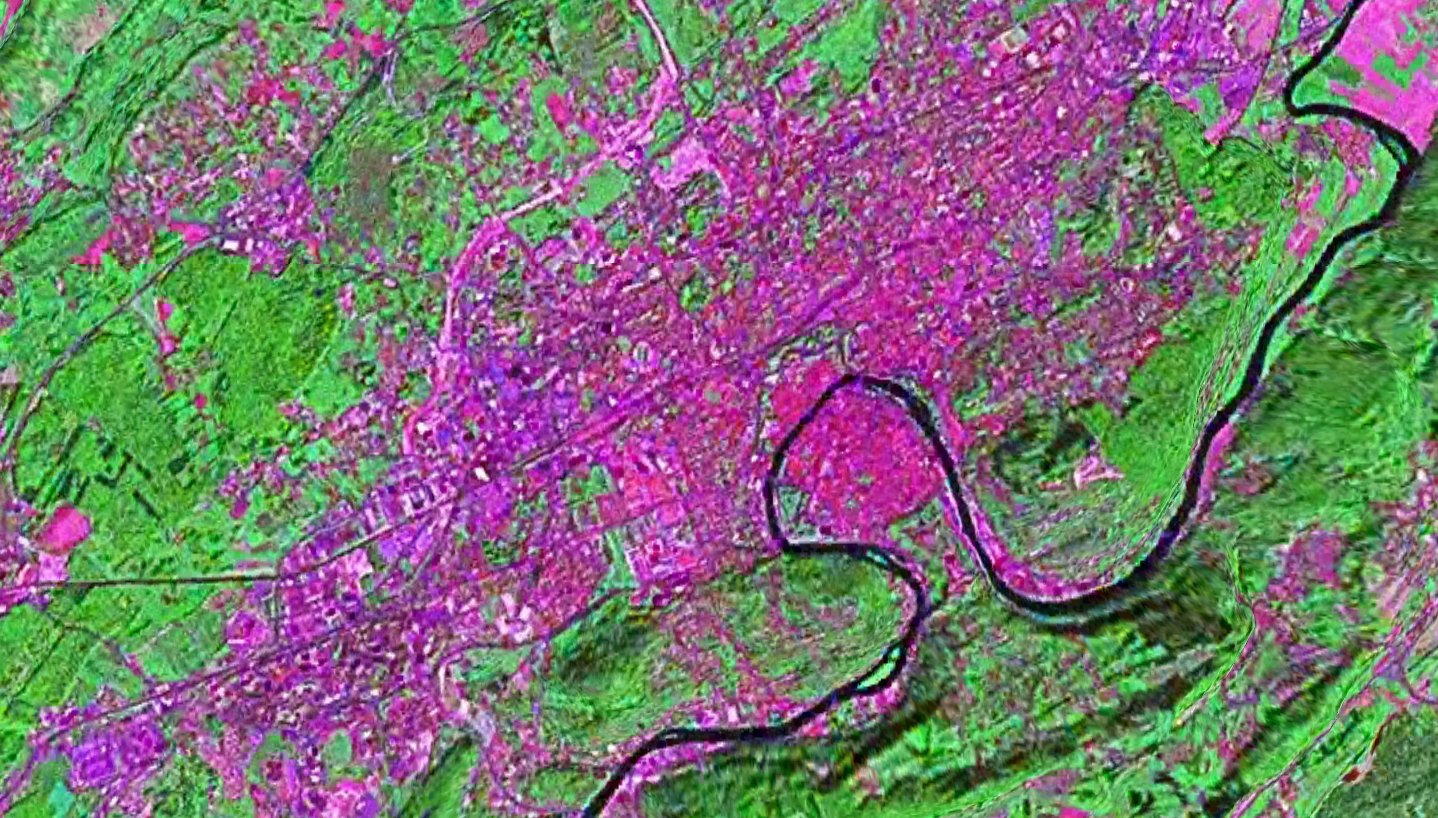
Site of Besançon (Landsat 7)

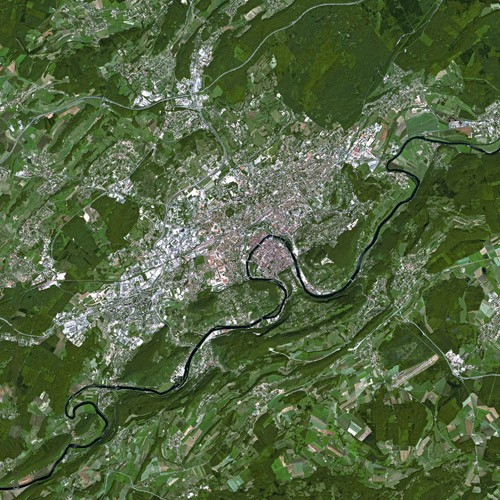
Besançon seen by Spot Satellite

=== Location ===
Besançon is located in the north-east quarter of France on the river Doubs. It is about 325 kilometres (202 miles) east of the national capital of Paris, 100 kilometres (62 miles) east of Dijon in Burgundy, 125 km (78 mi) northwest of Lausanne in Switzerland, and 100 km (62 mi) southwest of Belfort in Franche-Comté. It is located at the edge of the Jura Mountains.

=== Topography ===
The city initially developed in a natural meander (or oxbow loop) of the river Doubs with a diameter of almost 1,000 metres (3,281 feet). The flat inner loop has an elevation of about 250 metres (820 feet), and is bounded to the south by a hill called Mont Saint-Étienne, which has a maximum height of 371 metres (1,217 feet). The city is surrounded by six other hills which range in elevation from 400 to 500 metres (1,312 to 1,640 feet): Brégille, Griffon, Planoise, Chaudanne, Montfaucon, and Montboucon. (There is a barge canal that cuts through rock under Mont Saint-Étienne, short-cutting the meander.)

=== Climate ===
Besançon has an oceanic climate (Köppen: Cfb, Trewartha: Do), with cool to cold winters, warm summers, and frequent precipitation year-round. The year-round average is 11.5 °C (53 °F). The warmest month is July with an average temperature of 20 °C (68 °F), and the coldest is January, with an average temperature of 2 °C (36 °F). Besançon receives about 1,059 mm (42 in) of precipitation per year.

Climate data for Besançon, elevation: 307 m (1,007 ft), 1991–2020 normals, extremes 1884–present
Month	Jan	Feb	Mar	Apr	May	Jun	Jul	Aug	Sep	Oct	Nov	Dec	Year
Record high °C (°F)	18.6 (65.5)	21.7 (71.1)	25.1 (77.2)	29.1 (84.4)	32.2 (90.0)	36.6 (97.9)	40.3 (104.5)	38.3 (100.9)	34.6 (94.3)	30.1 (86.2)	23.0 (73.4)	20.8 (69.4)	40.3 (104.5)
Mean daily maximum °C (°F)	5.8 (42.4)	7.6 (45.7)	12.1 (53.8)	16.1 (61.0)	19.9 (67.8)	23.6 (74.5)	25.7 (78.3)	25.5 (77.9)	21.0 (69.8)	16.1 (61.0)	10.0 (50.0)	6.4 (43.5)	15.8 (60.4)
Daily mean °C (°F)	2.9 (37.2)	3.9 (39.0)	7.5 (45.5)	10.6 (51.1)	14.6 (58.3)	18.2 (64.8)	20.2 (68.4)	20.0 (68.0)	16.0 (60.8)	11.9 (53.4)	6.9 (44.4)	3.7 (38.7)	11.4 (52.5)
Mean daily minimum °C (°F)	0.1 (32.2)	0.2 (32.4)	3.0 (37.4)	5.6 (42.1)	9.4 (48.9)	12.9 (55.2)	14.7 (58.5)	14.5 (58.1)	11.1 (52.0)	7.7 (45.9)	3.5 (38.3)	0.9 (33.6)	7.0 (44.6)
Record low °C (°F)	−20.7 (−5.3)	−20.6 (−5.1)	−14.0 (6.8)	−5.2 (22.6)	−2.4 (27.7)	2.1 (35.8)	4.5 (40.1)	3.4 (38.1)	−0.1 (31.8)	−6.1 (21.0)	−11.3 (11.7)	−19.3 (−2.7)	−20.7 (−5.3)
Average precipitation mm (inches)	89.7 (3.53)	81.2 (3.20)	85.0 (3.35)	86.6 (3.41)	107.9 (4.25)	97.5 (3.84)	88.8 (3.50)	96.1 (3.78)	100.7 (3.96)	111.7 (4.40)	106.5 (4.19)	105.3 (4.15)	1,157 (45.55)
Average precipitation days (≥ 1.0 mm)	12.8	11.4	11.1	10.4	12.6	9.9	10.4	9.7	9.3	12.1	12.5	13.9	136.2
Average relative humidity (%)	87	82	77	74	77	77	75	78	82	87	87	88	81
Mean monthly sunshine hours	68.4	96.8	152.8	183.8	203.0	230.8	248.7	237.2	183.6	131.6	74.9	56.2	1,872.5
Source 1: Meteo France
Source 2: Infoclimat.fr (relative humidity 1961–1990)

== Religion ==
see Christianity in Besançon and Islam in Besançon

=== Neighborhoods ===
The 14 Besançon boroughs
1. La Boucle; 2. Velotte; 3. La Butte; 4. Battant; 5. Les Chaprais; 6. Bregille; 7. Saint-Ferjeux	8. Montrapon; 9. Saint-Claude; 10. Palente; 11. Les Clairs-Soleils; 12. Planoise; 13. Les Tilleroyes; 14. Chailluz

- La Boucle
- Battant
- Bregille
- Les Clairs-Soleils
- Velotte
- La Butte
- Les Chaprais
- Palente
- Les Tilleroyes
- Montrapon
- Planoise
- Saint-Claude
- Saint-Ferjeux
- Chailluz

== Population ==
As of 2022, the population of the City of Besançon was 120,057. It is the 34rd most populous city of France. Grand Besançon Métropole covers 528.6 km^{2} (204.1 sq mi), 67 municipalities and has a population of 198,387. The metropolitan area covers 2,514.5 km^{2} (970.9 sq mi), 308 municipalities and has 284,474 inhabitants. Its population increased by 4.9% between 2008 and 2020.

Historical population

Year	Pop.	±% p.a.
1793	25,328	—
1800	28,436	+1.67%
1806	28,727	+0.17%
1821	26,388	−0.56%
1831	29,167	+1.01%
1836	29,718	+0.38%
1841	36,461	+4.17%
1846	39,949	+1.84%
1851	41,295	+0.66%
1856	43,544	+1.07%
1861	46,786	+1.45%
1866	46,961	+0.07%
1872	49,401	+0.85%
1876	54,404	+2.44%
1881	57,067	+0.96%
1886	56,511	−0.20%
1891	56,055	−0.16%
1896	57,556	+0.53%
1901	55,362	−0.77%

Year	Pop.	±% p.a.
1906	56,168	+0.29%
1911	57,978	+0.64%
1921	55,652	−0.41%
1926	58,525	+1.01%
1931	60,367	+0.62%
1936	65,022	+1.50%
1946	63,508	−0.24%
1954	73,445	+1.83%
1962	95,642	+3.36%
1968	113,220	+2.85%
1975	120,315	+0.87%
1982	113,283	−0.86%
1990	113,828	+0.06%
1999	117,733	+0.38%
2007	117,836	+0.01%
2012	116,353	−0.25%
2017	115,934	−0.07%
2023	118,489	+0.36%

Source: EHESS and INSEE (1968–2023)

== Government and politics ==
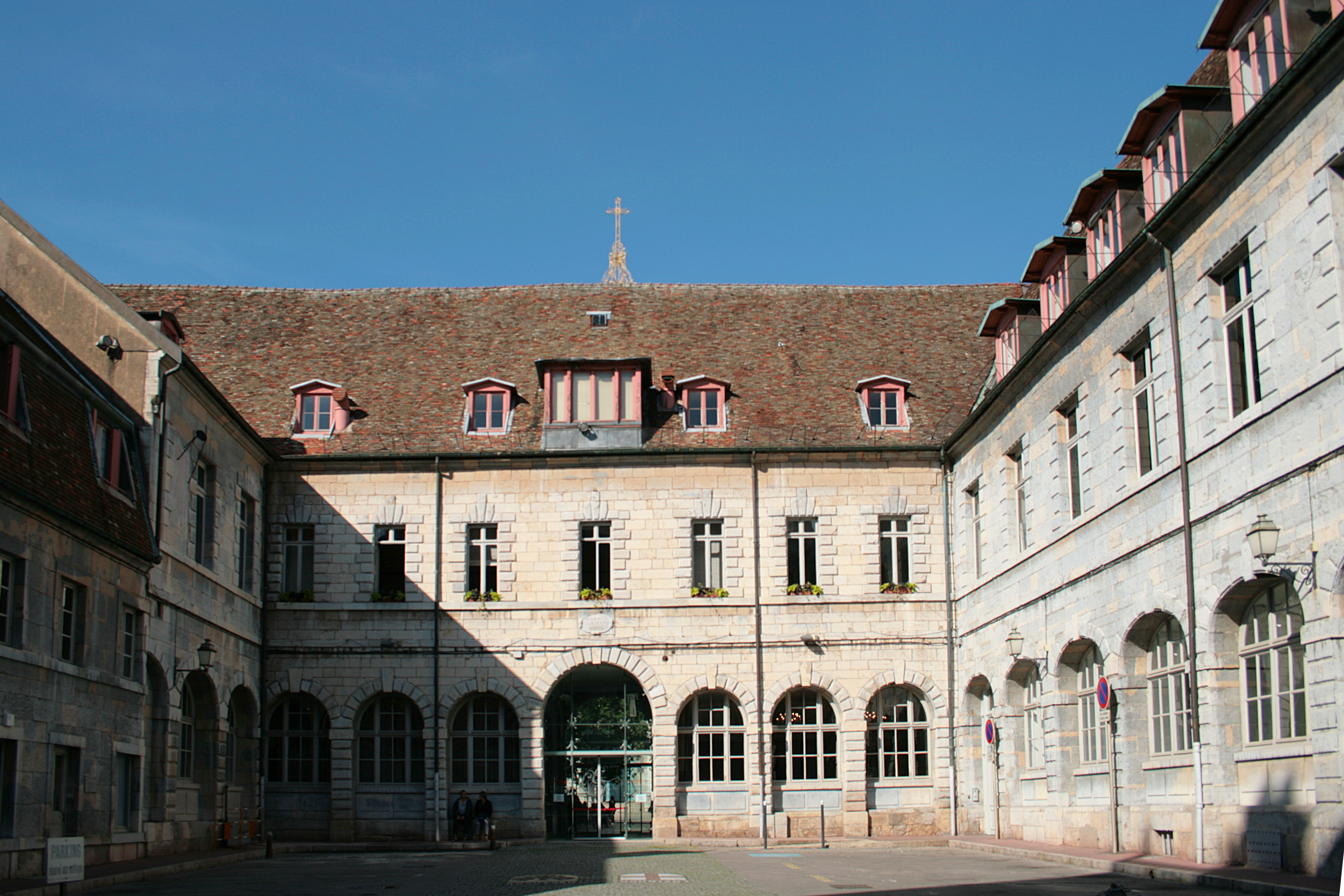
Courtyard of the former city hall

Until 2016, Besançon was the capital of the Franche-Comté administrative région of France, a région including the four départements of Doubs, Haute-Saône, Jura and Territoire de Belfort. Franche-Comté was since merged with the neighbouring region of Burgundy, and the "préfecture" was transferred to the city of Dijon. However, Besançon remains the seat of the Bourgogne-Franche-Comté regional council and of various decentralised administrations such as the regional offices of the French National Institute for Statistics and Economic Studies (Insee) or the Centre régional des œuvres universitaires et scolaires (Crous).

Mayor of the City of Besançon is Ludovic Fagaut (LR).

== Economy ==
The city is known for its microtechnology and watch industries. It is host of the biannual Micronora trade fair, one of Europe's major events in the field of microtechnologies. The city has a little-known specialty, automatic ticketing machines for car parking, airports, date stamping etc.

The watch industry, for which Besançon remains the French capital, endured a major crisis in the 1970s when the advent of quartz watches from Asia knocked out the traditional watch industry in the space of just a few years. The "Lip" affair epitomizes the industrial crisis. LIP is to this day the name of one of Besançon's most prestigious brands of watches. Refusing to let their factory close, the workers set up a cooperative to run it. The action produced a lot of notoriety and sympathy for the workers but also resulted in branding Besançon as a city of the radical left. It also did nothing to help revive the watch industry; the cooperative went out of business a short while later. The city took a long time to recover from the collapse of the watch industry and its other major industry of the industrial age, artificial textiles.

Since the 1980s, Besançon's watch industry has clawed its way back on the basis of its historic reputation and quartz watches, establishing itself in a number of niche markets including customized watches, high quality watches, and fashion articles. Since the 1990s, the town has developed a reputation as one of France's leading centres of technology in all fields, including telecommunications and biotechnology.

== Education ==
Besançon is the seat of the Marie and Louis Pasteur University. As of 2018, there were approximately 24,000 students enrolled at the university, including around 3,000 foreign students. The Institut Supérieur d'Ingénieurs de Franche-Comté (ISIFC), part of the Université de Franche-Comté, is the first school created in the country specifically for the Biomedical engineering field. The city is also home of the École Nationale Supérieure de Mécanique et des Microtechniques (ENSMM), a technological school with a strong reputation in the fields of microtechnology and mechanics and the Centre for Applied Linguistics which teaches ten languages to non-native speakers (French, Arabic, Chinese, English, German, Italian, Japanese, Portuguese, Russian, Spanish) and any other known language on request. The Centre welcomes more than 4,000 students every year from all over the world. As well as being famed as one of France's finest "villes d'art" (art cities), Besançon is the seat of one of France's older universities, of France's National School of Mechanics and Micromechanics, and one of the best known French language schools in France, the CLA.

== Landmarks ==
The most historic center of the town is characterised by the broad horse-shoe of the river Doubs, "la Boucle", which encircles the old town. Vauban's imposing Citadelle blocks off the neck. The historic center presents an ensemble of classic stone buildings, some dating back to the Middle Ages and others to the Spanish Renaissance.

=== Gallo-Roman remains ===
During Antiquity, Vesontio was an important metropolis of Roman Gaul. It is adorned with monuments, some of which have survived, archaeological excavations carried out during construction sites often revealing new discoveries dating from this period.

The most emblematic and best-preserved monument dating from this period is the Porte Noire, a Gallo-Roman triumphal arch built under Marcus Aurelius in the 2nd century in the Saint-Jean district. Heavily deteriorated by the vagaries of time and pollution, it was the subject of a long and difficult restoration operation at the beginning of the 21st century. Immediately below is the Square Castan, a garden with a collection of archaeological remains from the 2nd century or the 3rd century including in particular eight Corinthian columns.

On the other bank of the river Doubs, in the Battant district, the remains of the Vesontio arena are visible: only a few steps and foundations have been unearthed, its stones having been widely used in the Middle Ages for the construction of other buildings.

There are several domus in the residential district of Vesontio. Among them, the domus of the Palace of Justice and the domus of the Lumière college with Roman mosaic exhibited in situ at the Besançon Museum of Fine Arts and Archeology. Other remains can be seen in more anonymous places, such as the ancient foundations in the underground car park of the Bourgogne-Franche-Comté regional council.

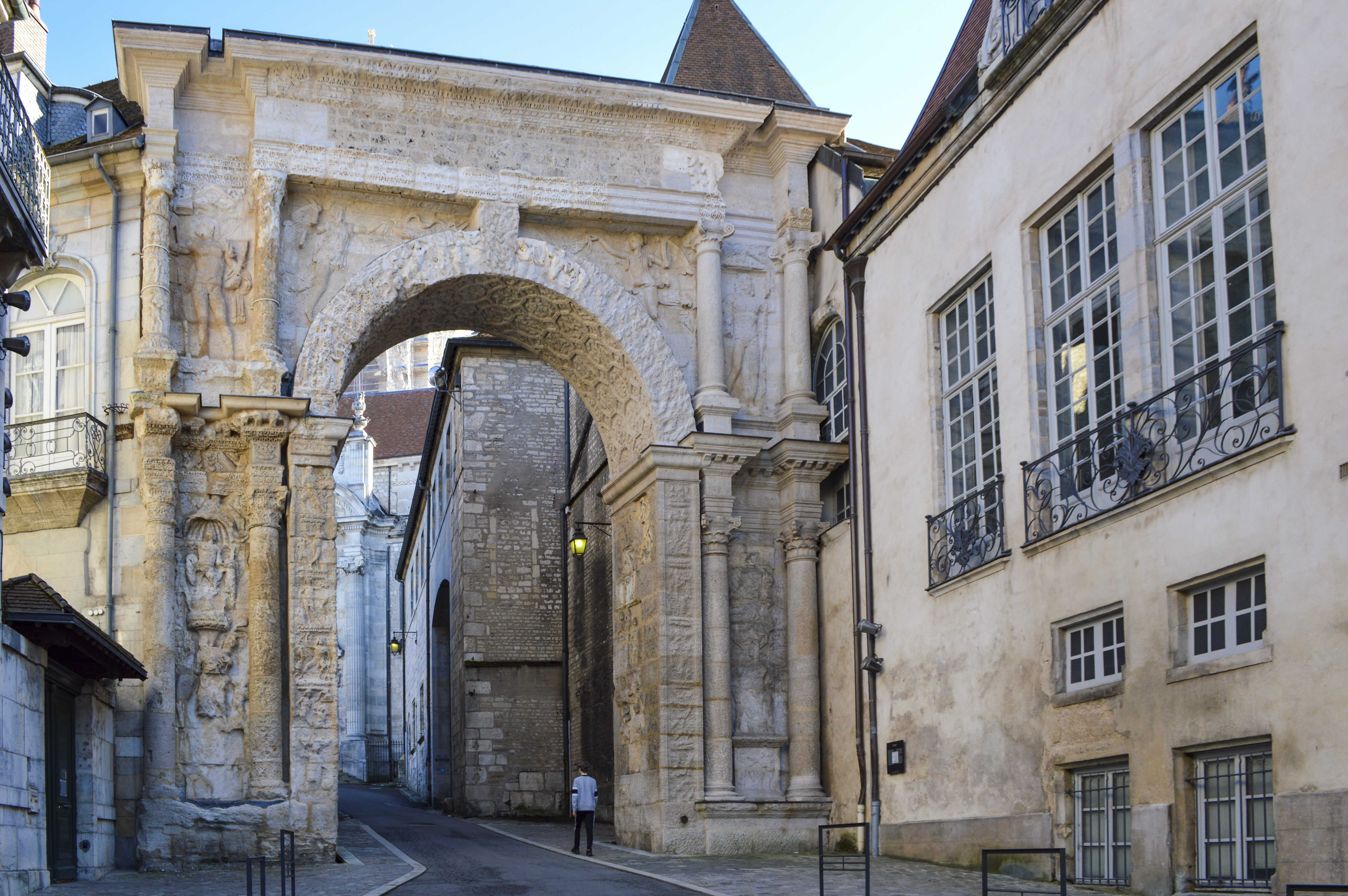
The Porte Noire, Roman triumphal arch

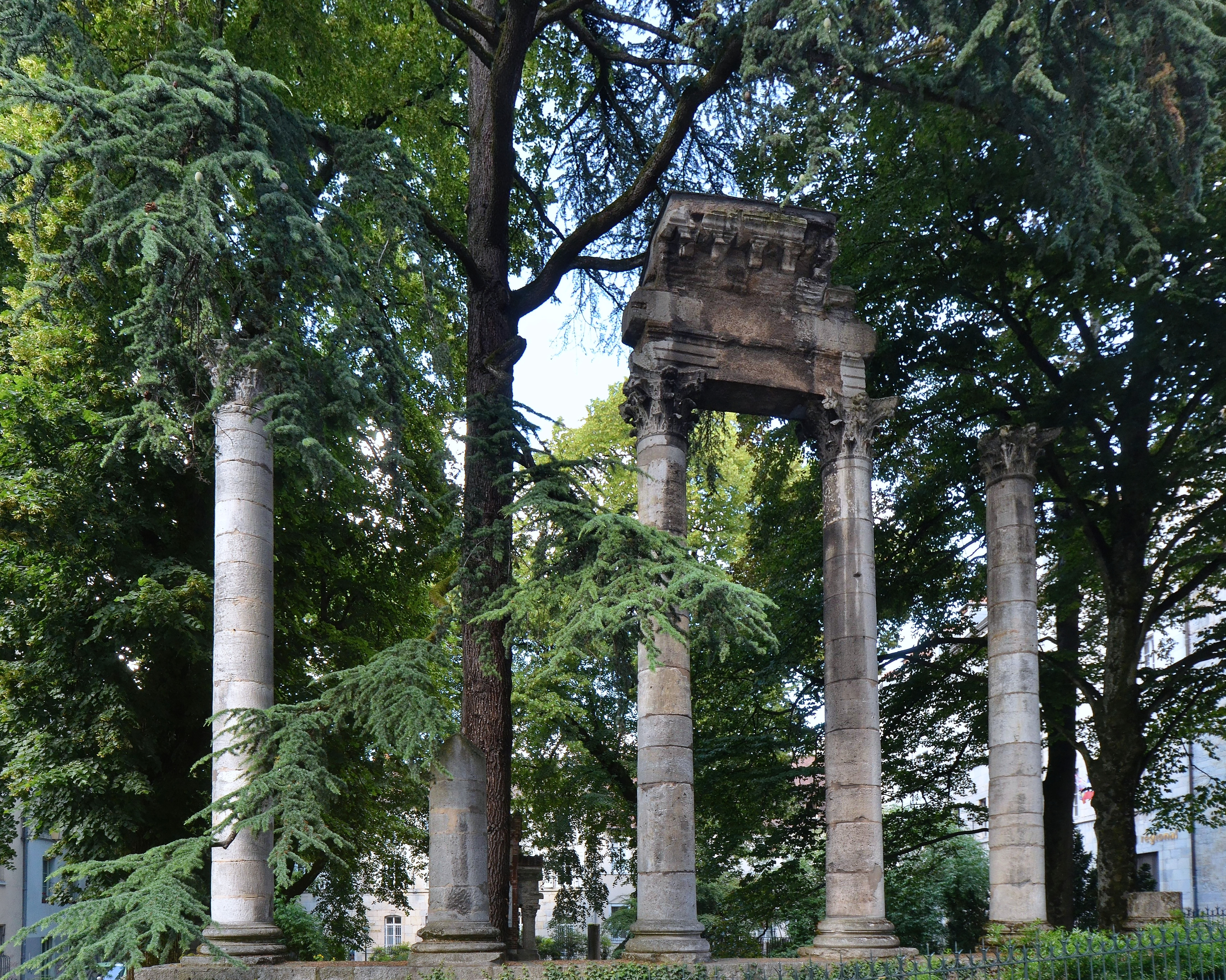
Square Castan.

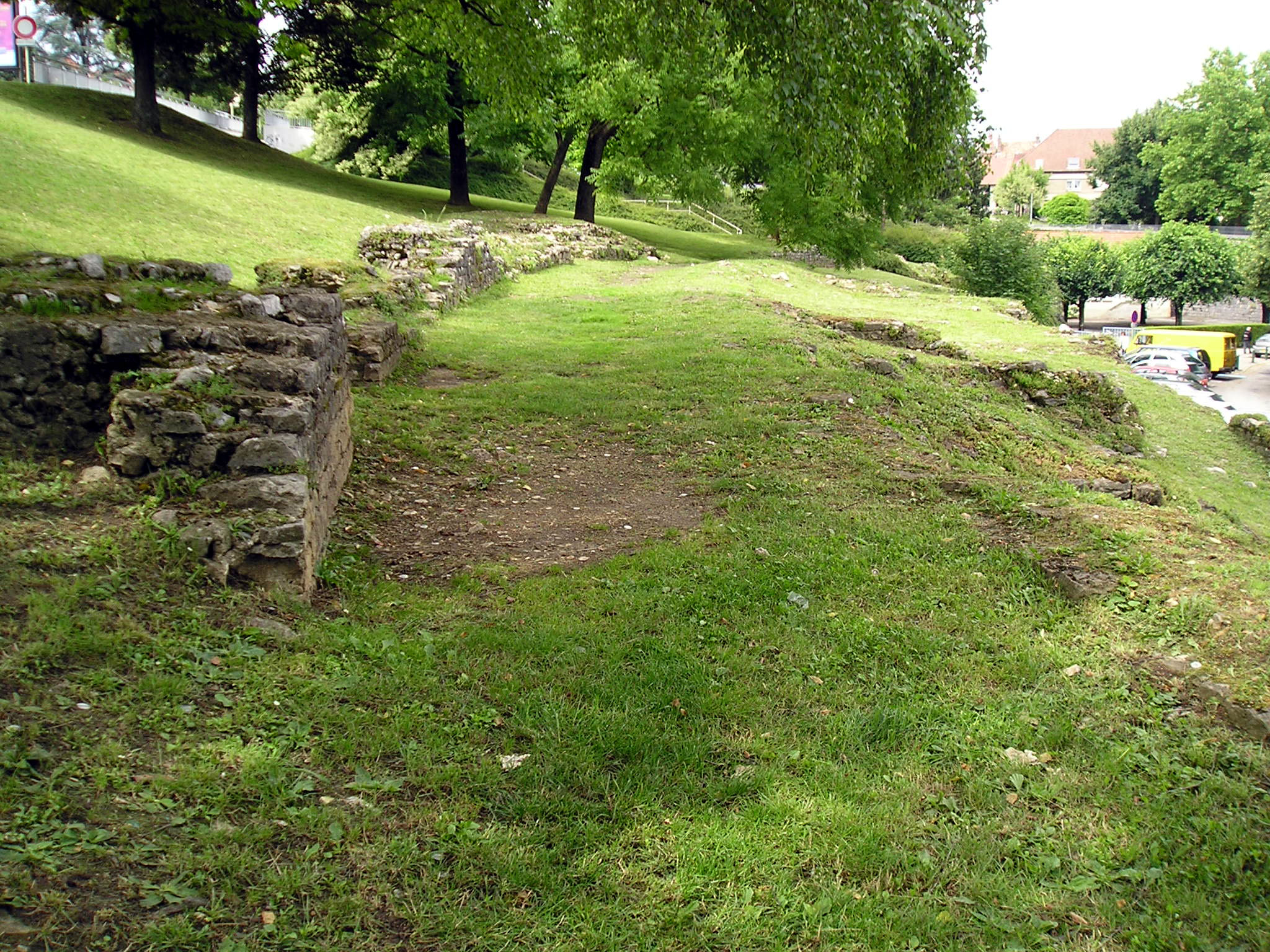
Archaeological remains of the Arena.

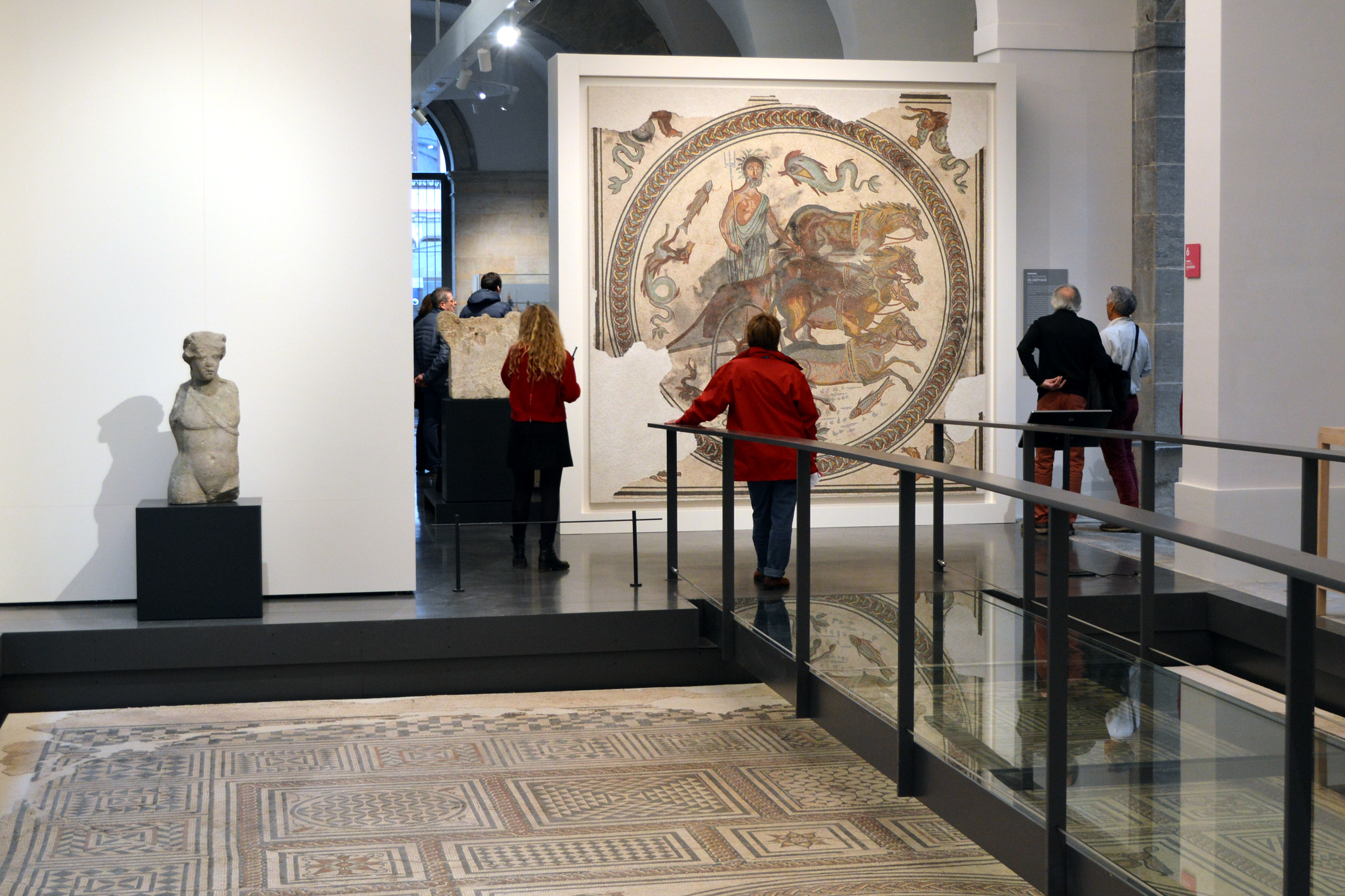
Roman mosaics from ancient Vesontio.

=== Fortifications and military buildings ===
Most of the current fortification system (citadel, defensive wall made up of ramparts and bastions, Fort Griffon) is the work of the military engineer Sébastien Le Prestre de Vauban. This group of buildings allows Besançon to appear on the UNESCO World Heritage List with eleven other sites under the title Fortifications of Vauban. The forts on the other hills were all built in the 19th century. The only remaining pre-Vauban fortifications are Porte Rivotte, Porte Taillée, Tour Carrée, Tour Notre-Dame and Tour de la Pelote.

The citadel of Besançon was built by Vauban from 1678 to 1771 and is the most visited site in Franche-Comté with more than 250,000 visitors each year. It extends over eleven hectares at the top of Mont Saint-Étienne at an altitude between 330 and 370 meters, thus overhanging the meander of the river Doubs which has an altitude between 240 and 250 meters. It brings together a museum of Resistance and Deportation, a museum of Franche-Comté traditions, the regional archeology service and a zoo. It is the symbol of the city. Fort Griffon, whose name is that of the Italian architect Jean Griffoni who was commissioned to build a first fortification at this location in 1595, is a second citadel. It was Vauban who, at the end of the 17th century, had the current fort built.

The city walls designed by Vauban includes all the fortifications of La Boucle historic district which were rebuilt from 1675 to 1695. Vauban in fact replaced the medieval defenses restored and completed by Charles V in the sixteenth century with a belt provided with six bastioned battery towers: the Notre-Dame tower, the bastioned tower of Chamars, the bastioned tower of the Marais, the bastioned tower of the Cordeliers (completed in 1691), the bastioned tower of Bregille and the bastioned tower of Rivotte.

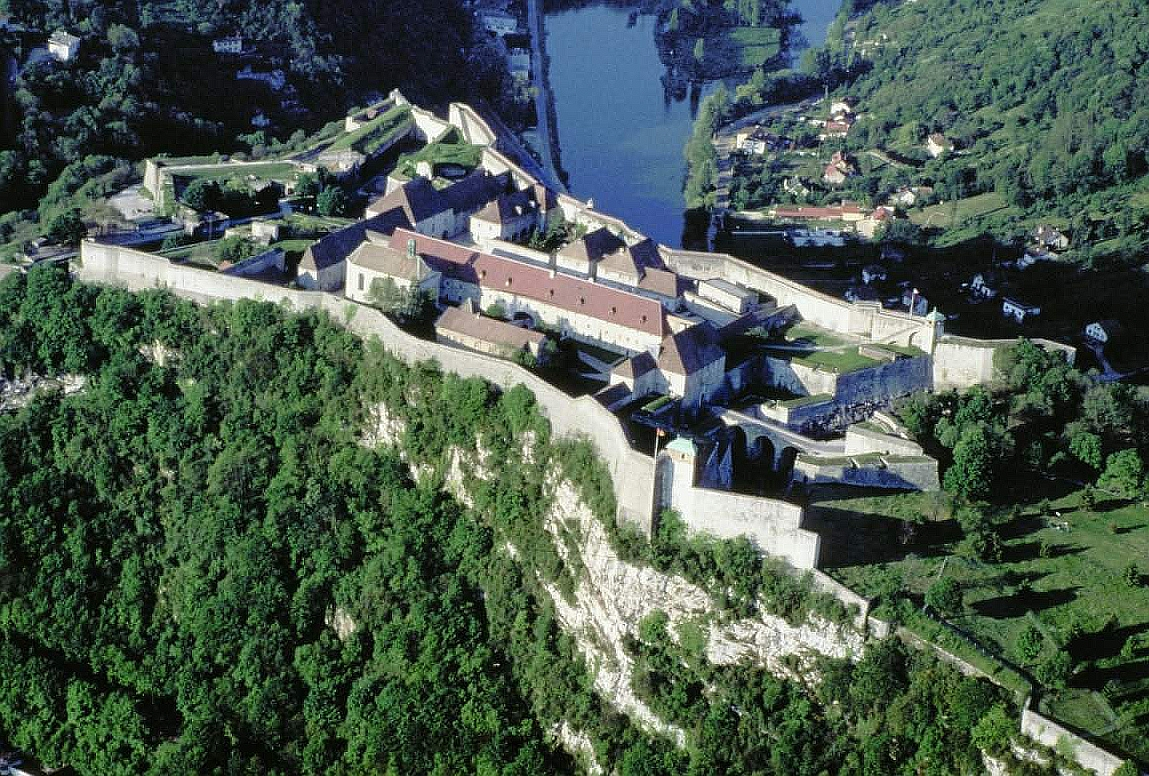
Citadel of Besançon.

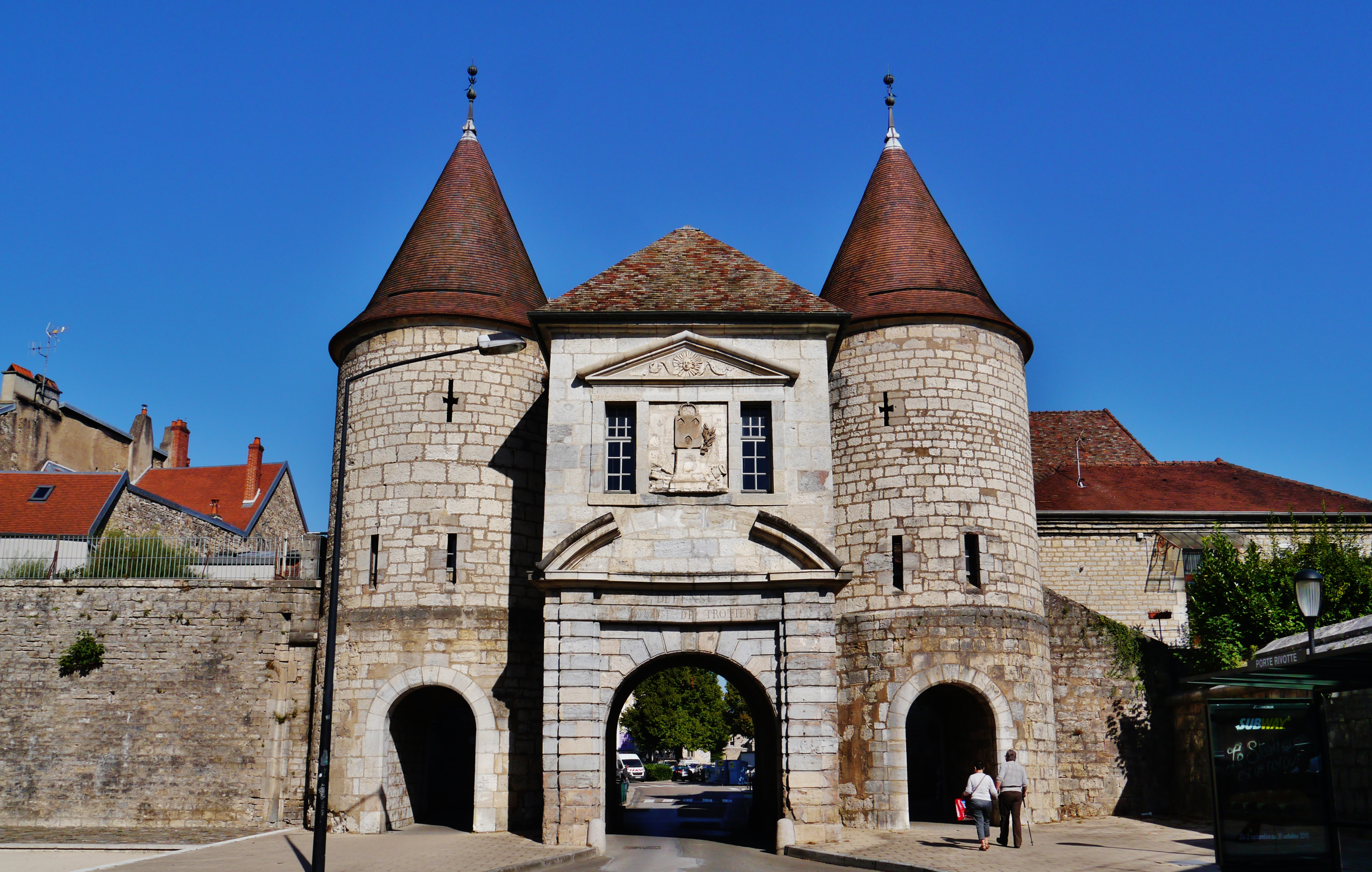
Porte Rivotte.

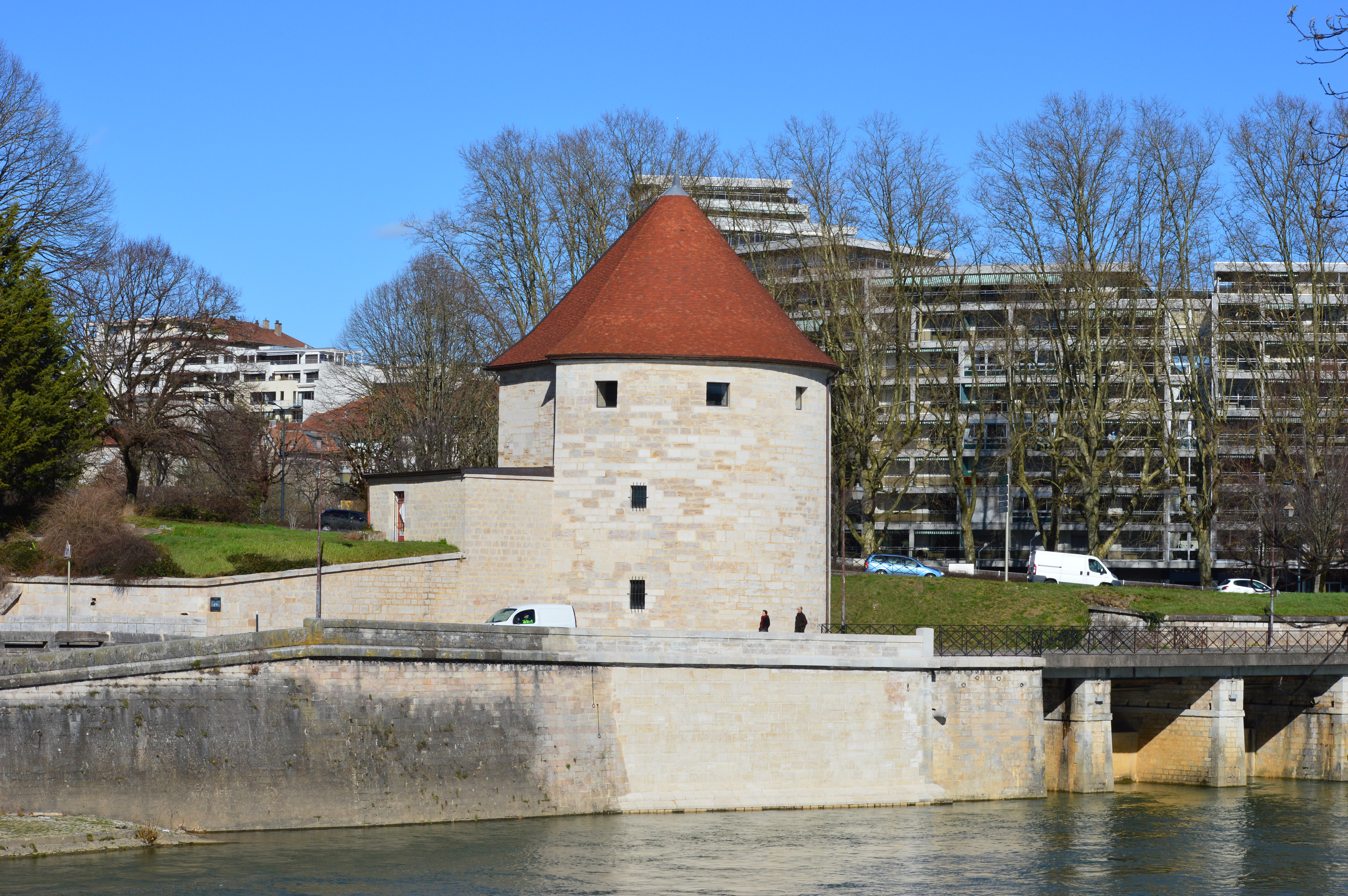
Tour de la Pelote.

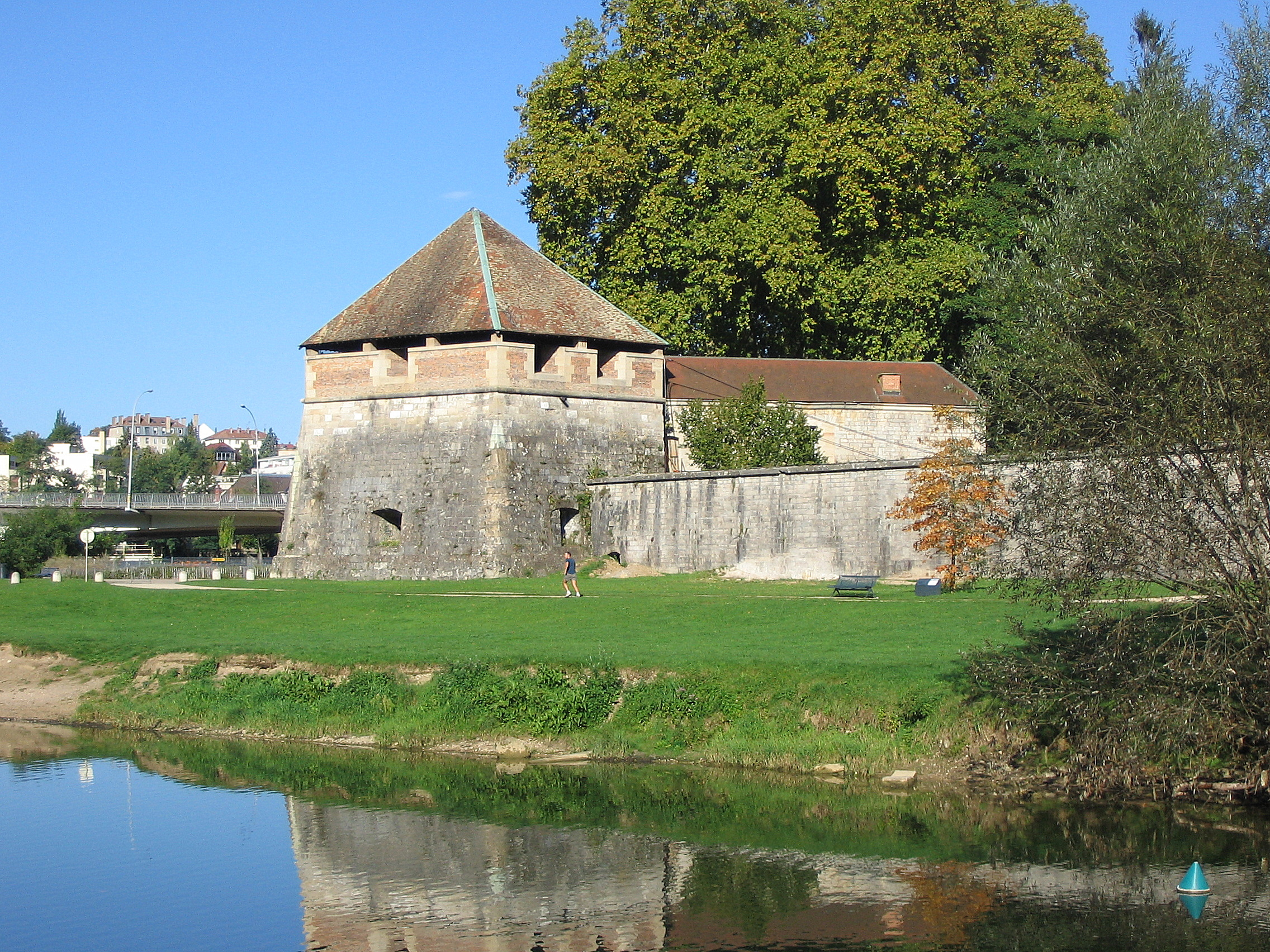
Tour de Chamars.

Fortifications prior to the French conquest are also numerous. The Tour de la Pelote, located on the Quai de Strasbourg, is a defensive tower built in 1546 by the municipal government on the orders of Charles V. Its name would come from the former owner of the land where it was built, Pierre Pillot, lord of Chenecey. The Porte Rivotte is a city gate dating from the 16th century, consisting of two round towers and a pediment carved with a sun which was King Louis XIV's personal emblem. The Porte Taillée ("Carved Gate"), opened in a rocky outcrop, is the work of the Romans. It marks the entrance to the city on the road to Switzerland. It is surmounted by a guardhouse and a watchtower built in 1546. The "square tower", located in the promenade des Glacis, is also called the Montmart tower. It was built in the 13th century to defend the old entrance to the Battant district.

The fortifications of the 19th century consist of a set of forts covering all the heights of the city: the fort of Chaudanne built from 1837 to 1842, the fort of Bregille built from 1820 to 1832, the fort of Planoise built from 1877 to 1880, Fort Benoit was built from 1877 to 1880, Fort Beauregard in 1830.

Another example are the Trois-Châtels and Tousey lunettes, both built at the end of the 18th and early 19th centuries, as well as the Rosemont battery built during the war of 1870–1871, the Fort des Montboucons built from 1877 to 1880 and the Fort des Justices built from 1870. A third Lunette d'Arçon was located on the site of Fort Chaudanne; only its tower was preserved during the construction of the fort in the first half of the 19th century.

The Ruty barracks, formerly Saint-Paul barracks, are made up of four pavilions surrounding a courtyard serving as a Place d'Armes and dating from the 18th and 19th centuries. It currently houses the headquarters of the 1st Armored Division and the 7th Armoured Brigade.

=== Places of worship ===
After the city acquired an episcopal see in the 3rd century, churches and abbeys multiplied during the period of the High Middle Ages. Important constructions or reconstructions of religious buildings then took place in the 11th century during the episcopate of Hugues Ier de Salins and many churches were embellished or rebuilt after the French conquest of 1674. In 1842, the Church of the Holy Spirit was officially ceded to the Protestant community while the Jewish community inaugurated its synagogue in 1869. Finally, the Muslim community had two mosques built at the end of the 20th century and the beginning of the 21st century.

The most important religious building dedicated to Catholic worship in Besançon is Saint John's Cathedral, of Gothic architecture, dating from the 9th, 12th and 18th centuries. It has two apses and contains a masterpiece by Fra Bartolomeo, the painting of the Madonna in Glory with Saints painted in 1512. The cathedral dominates the old chapter district which includes the Archbishopric of Besançon located in the former Hôtel Boistouset and the former Archbishop's Palace currently occupied by the Rectorate of the academy. The Grand Seminary was built from 1670 to 1695 by Archbishop Antoine-Pierre Ier de Grammont and completed in the 18th century by the elevation of the portal and the construction of the main facade. The chapel has a two-storey facade of Corinthian pilasters on the street. Its portal is surmounted by a tympanum where the sculptor Huguenin represented a Madonna and Child in 1848.

At the other end of the old cardo and current Grande Rue, is the Sainte-Madeleine church built from 1746 to 1766 on plans by Nicolas Nicole. It was definitively completed in 1828–1830 with the construction of its two towers, one of which hosts the Jacquemart bellstriker automaton. Its roof is made of polychrome glazed tiles.

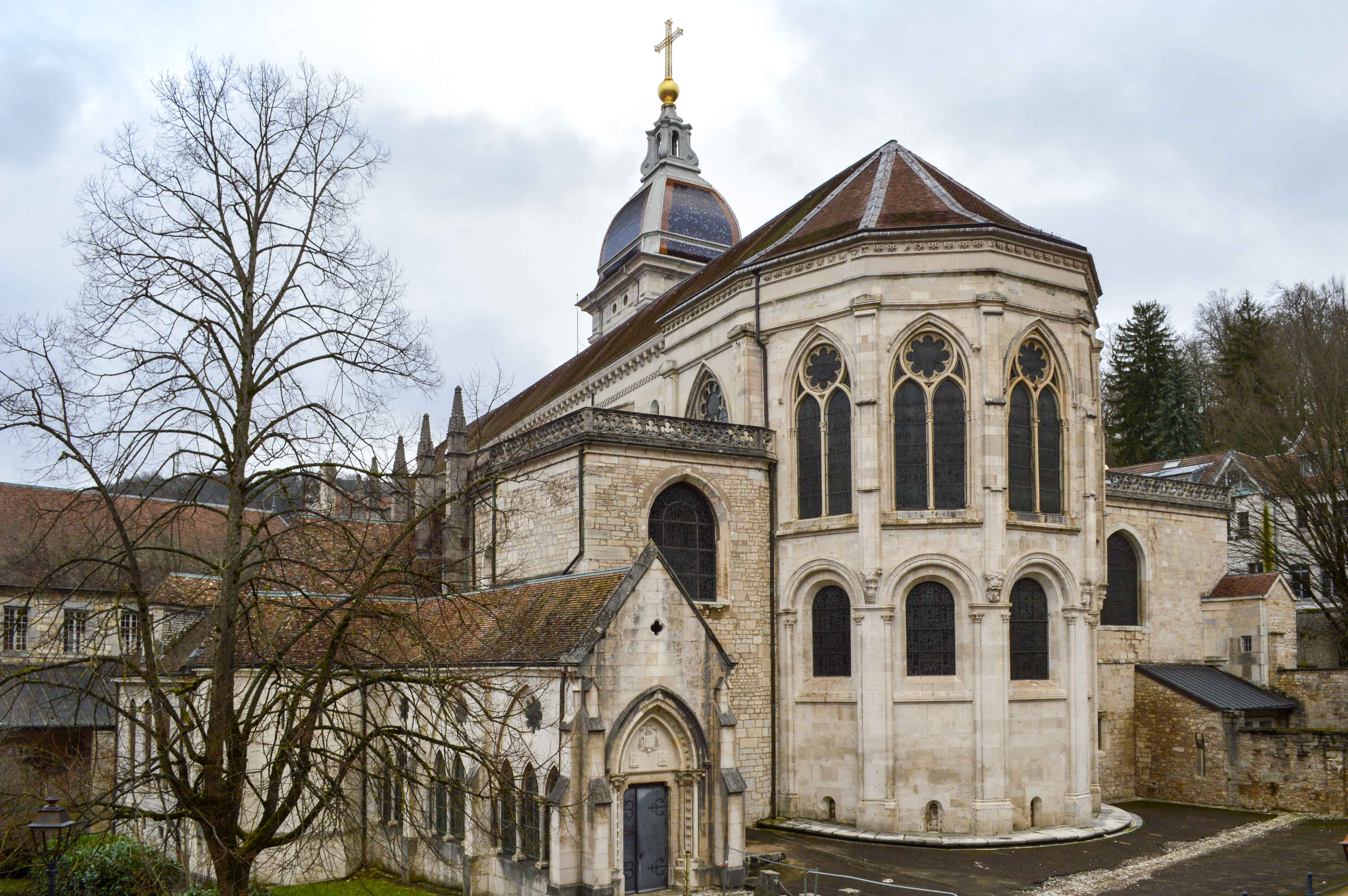
St. John's Cathedral.

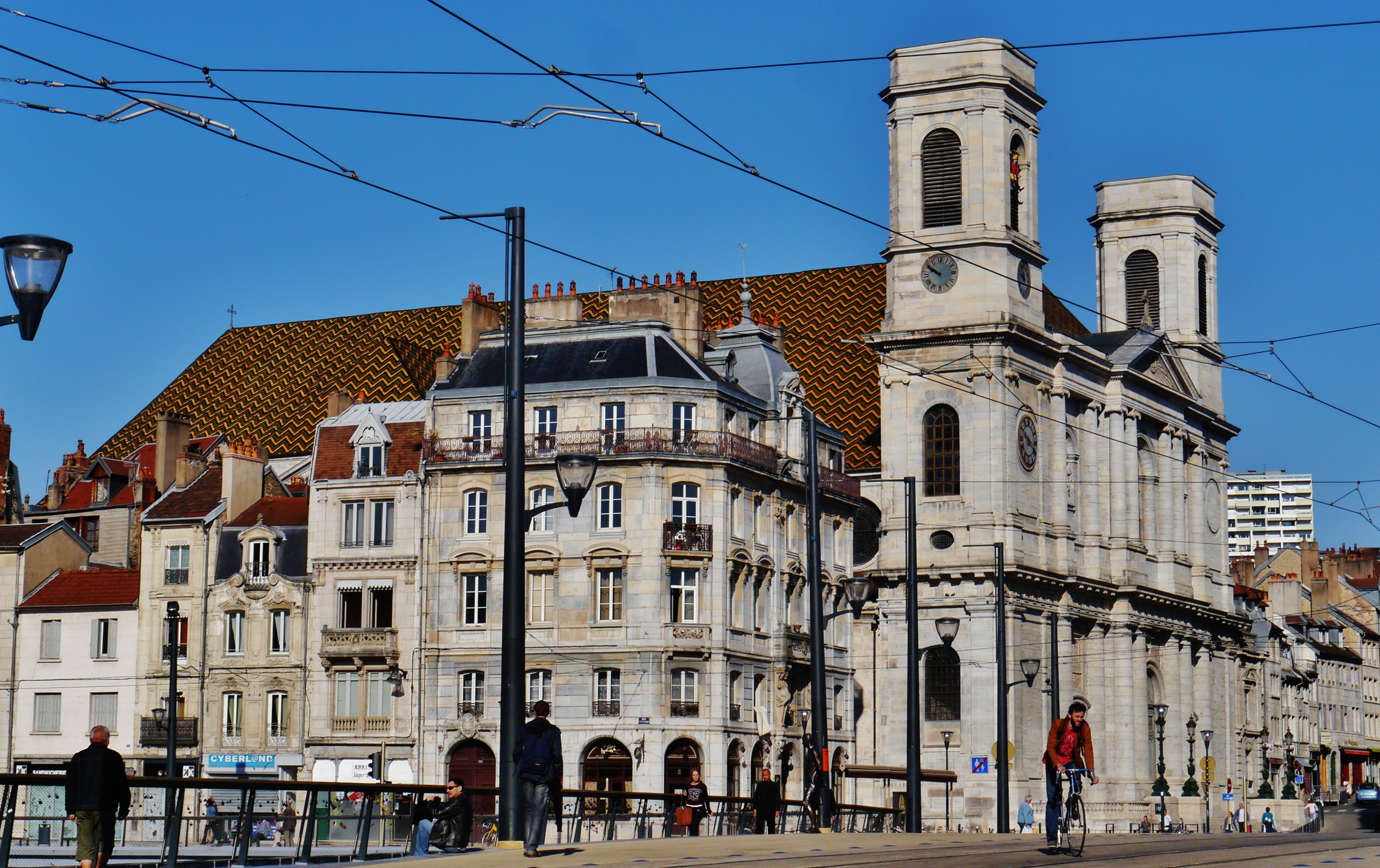
Sainte-Madeleine Church.

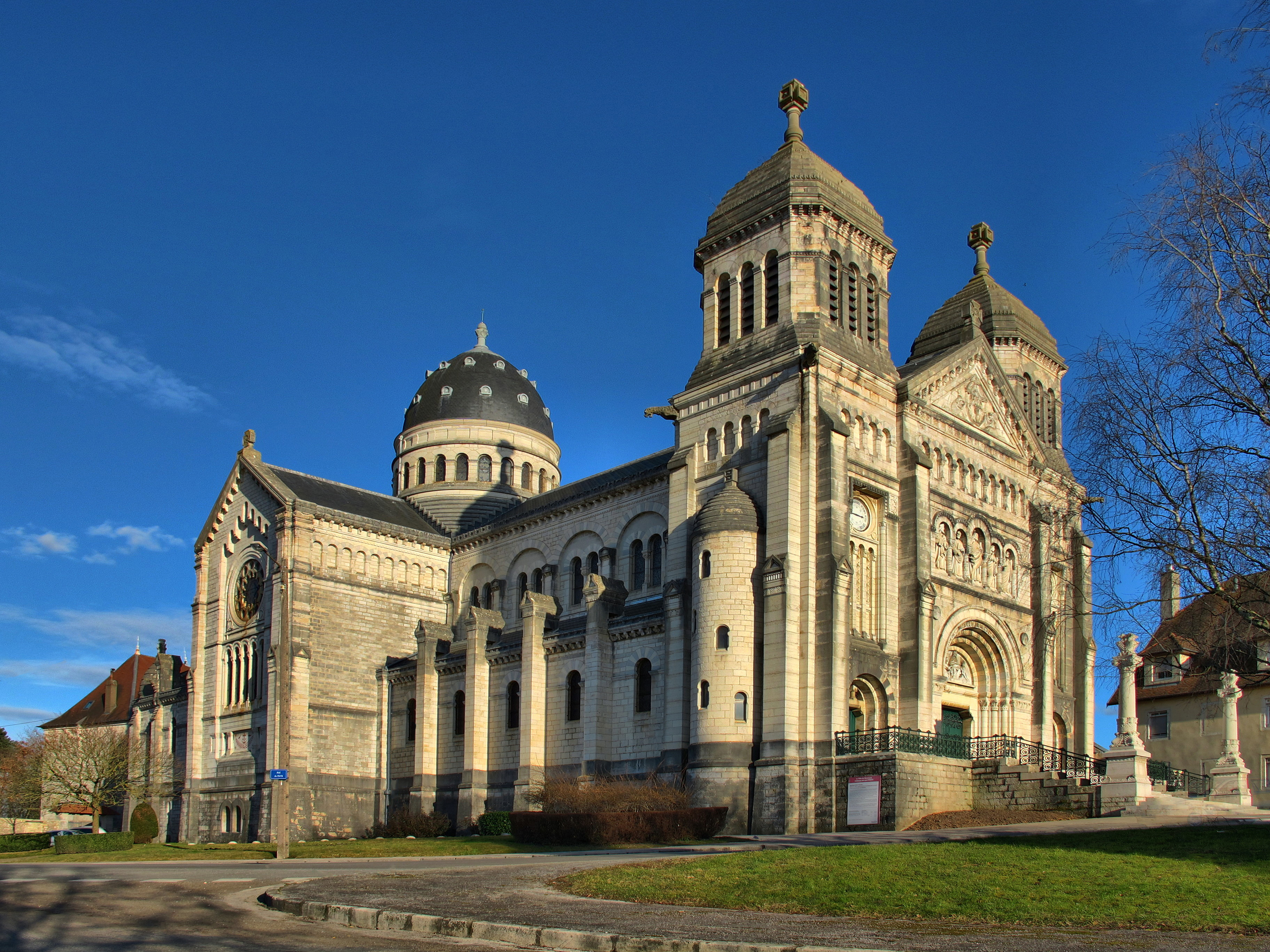
Saint-Ferjeux Basilica.

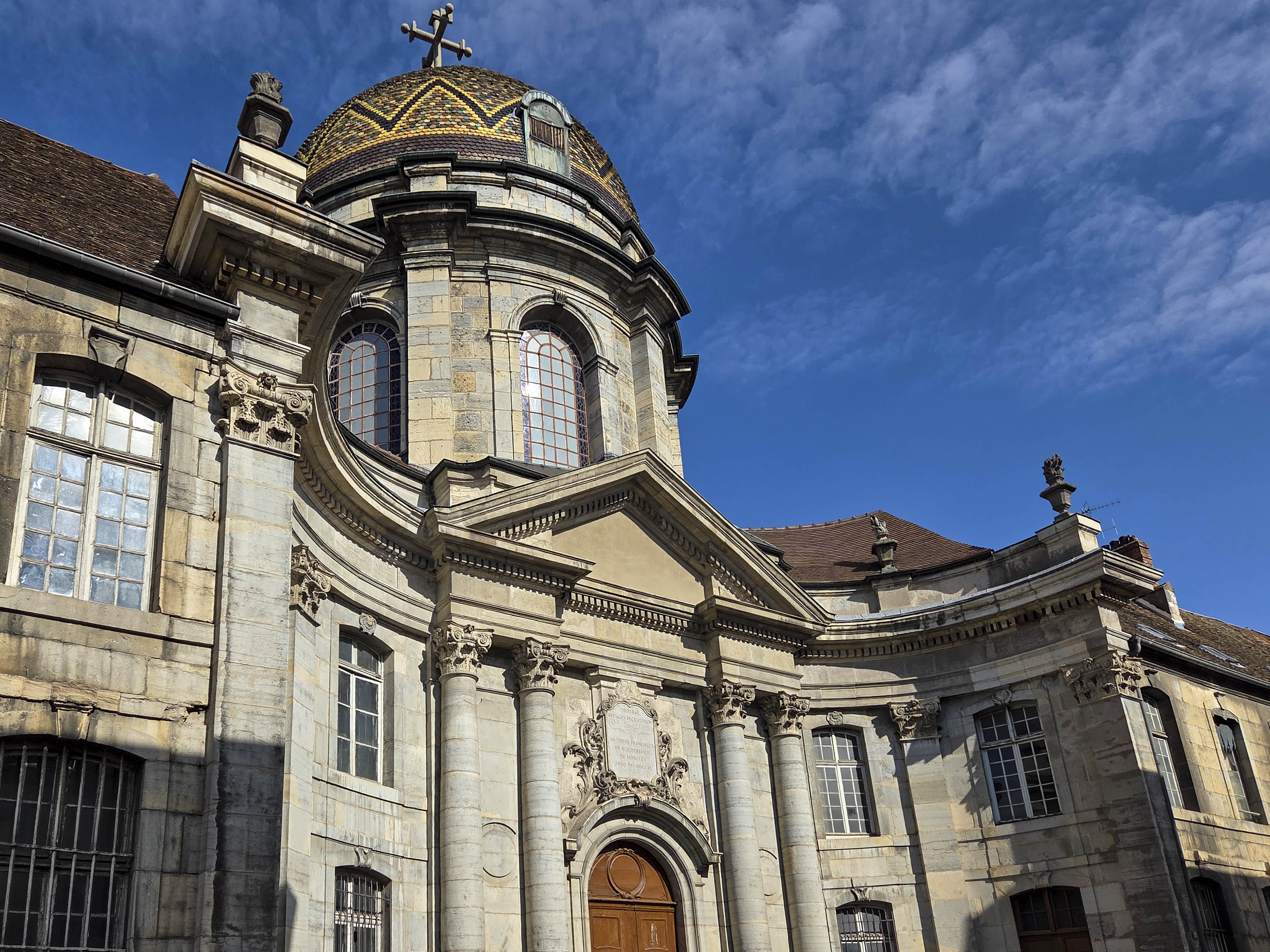
Notre-Dame-du-Refuge Chapel.

In the heart of the city centre, St Peter's Church, built by the Bisontin Claude Joseph Alexandre Bertrand from 1782 to 1786, impresses with the height of its bell tower which served as a belfry for the Hôtel de Ville, which is opposite. St Maurice's Church, founded in the 6th century, was rebuilt from 1711 to 1714 with a Jesuit-style facade surmounted by a carillon. Notre-Dame Church corresponds to the former Benedictine abbey of Saint-Vincent which was founded in the eleventh century. It was under the Empire that it became the parish church of Notre-Dame. Its facade was designed in 1720 by the architect Jean-Pierre Galezot. You can still make out the large entrance gate to the abbey and the 16th-century bell tower. Today it is occupied by the Faculty of Letters and Human Sciences. Saint-François-Xavier Church, former chapel of the Jesuit college, was built between 1680 and 1688. Its plan is in the shape of a Latin cross surrounded by small side chapels. It was decommissioned in 1975. The Saint-Paul abbey, church of the former abbey founded around 628 by Saint Donat, archbishop of Besançon, was rebuilt in the fourteenth and fifteenth centuries. The Notre-Dame-du-Foyer chapel, built from 1739 to 1745 by the Bisontin Nicolas Nicole, was once the chapel of the Couvent du Refuge before being attached to the Saint-Jacques hospital in 1802.

Outside the old town, among the important Catholic buildings, is the Saint-Ferjeux basilica of Romano-Byzantine style built on the cave of the patron saints of Besançon, Saint Ferjeux and Saint Ferréol. Notre-Dame des Buis, a 19th-century chapel, overlooks the city at an altitude of 491 metres.

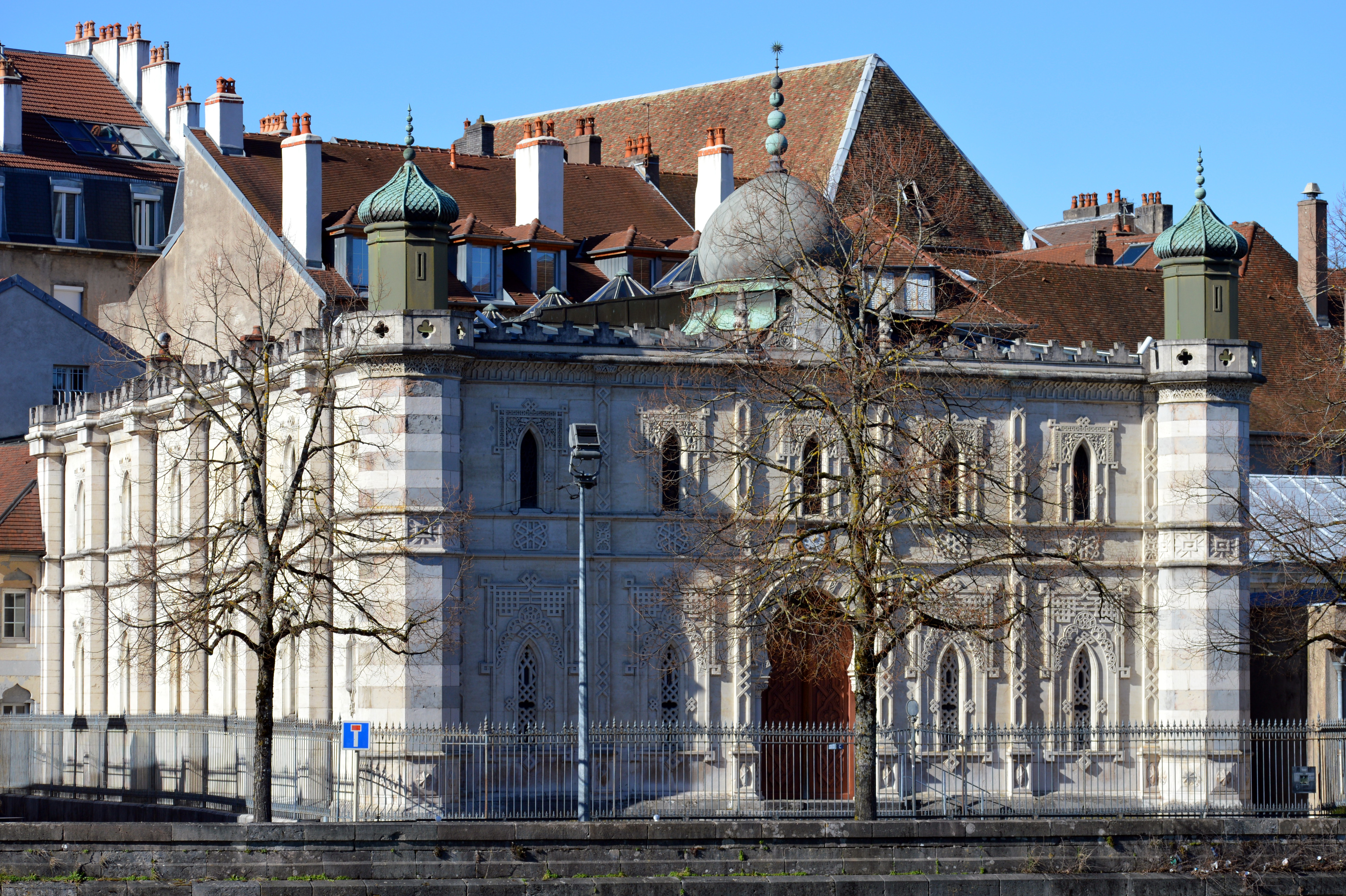
Synagogue of Besançon

The Protestant community was assigned in 1842 the former hospice of the Holy Spirit, today the temple of the Holy Spirit. It is a 13th-century Gothic building augmented by a 15th-century chapel and deprived of its bell tower during the Revolution. It is distinguished by its gallery of sculpted wood, a masterpiece by an anonymous artist. Its neo-Gothic portal was created in 1841 by the architect Alphonse Delacroix in place of the old porch.

The Jewish community, booming in the city in the middle of the 19th century, built the synagogue of Besançon from 1869 to 1871 on plans by the architect Pierre Marnotte. Listed as a historic monument in 1984, it is particularly remarkable for its Moorish style inspired by the Alhambra in Granada.

The most recently built places of worship in Besançon are of Muslim faith: the Sounna Mosque built at the end of the 20th century on land ceded by the city in the Saint-Claude district, and the Al-Fath located in the district of Planoise.

=== Government and residentials buildings ===
In the 16th century, many palaces and mansions were erected in the Boucle and Battant districts. The most important is the Palais Granvelle with Renaissance architecture built for Nicolas Perrenot de Granvelle, Chancellor and Keeper of the Seals of Emperor Charles V. It now houses the Museum of Time. The Hôtel de Ville (city hall) was built by the architect Richard Maire who completed it in 1573. It has an ashlar façade in the spirit of Italian Renaissance palaces. Until the Revolution, a large niche in the façade housed a bronze statue of Charles V riding a two-headed eagle.

The Palais de Justice (Court of Appeal) was originally the second main building to the Hôtel de Ville. The construction was entrusted to the architect Hugues Sambin who was greatly inspired by the spirit of the Renaissance. The Hôtel de Champagney was built in the Battant district by Jacques Bonvalot, Lord of Champagney, during the first half of the 16th century. His daughter Nicole Bonvalot, widow of Nicolas de Granvelle, had the premises redesigned and the courtyard designed from 1560 to 1565 by architect Richard Maire. It is distinguished by the four gargoyles that adorn its facade and by its interior courtyard with arched passageways and galleries with wooden columns. The Hôtel Mareschal belonged to an important Besançon family, the Mareschal family. Burnt down on 4 June 1516, Guillaume Mareschal had it rebuilt in 1532 with an ornamental flora that heralded the Renaissance. Other notable buildings dating from the sixteenth century are the Hôtels of Chevanney, Gauthiot d'Ancier, Anvers, Bonvalot, and Bouteiller. At that time, the hills around Besançon were covered with vineyards: the city has preserved from this important viticultural past a dozen cabordes, former vineyard huts made of dry limestone.

Immediately after the French conquest, the installations were mainly of a military nature. However, two other notable constructions were erected at the end of the 17th century. Work on the Saint-Jacques hospital, which was intended to replace the one located on rue d'Arènes, began in 1688 and was completed in 1701. Its monumental entrance gate, executed by the locksmith Nicolas Chapuis in 1703 has been replaced by a copy. The Vauban Quay was built from 1691 to 1695 by the engineer Isaac Robelin. It is a monumental set of houses with arcades.

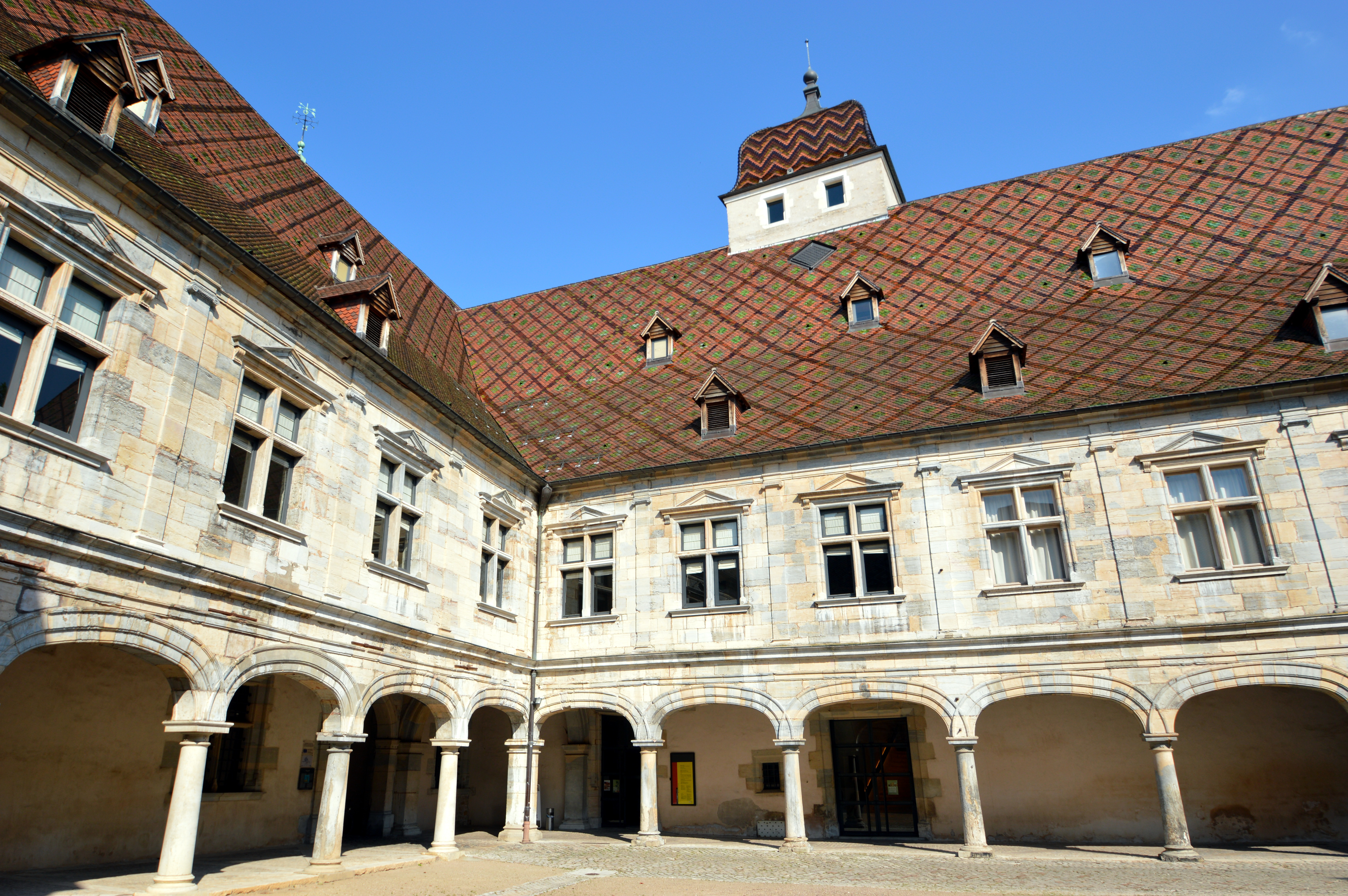
Palais Granvelle.

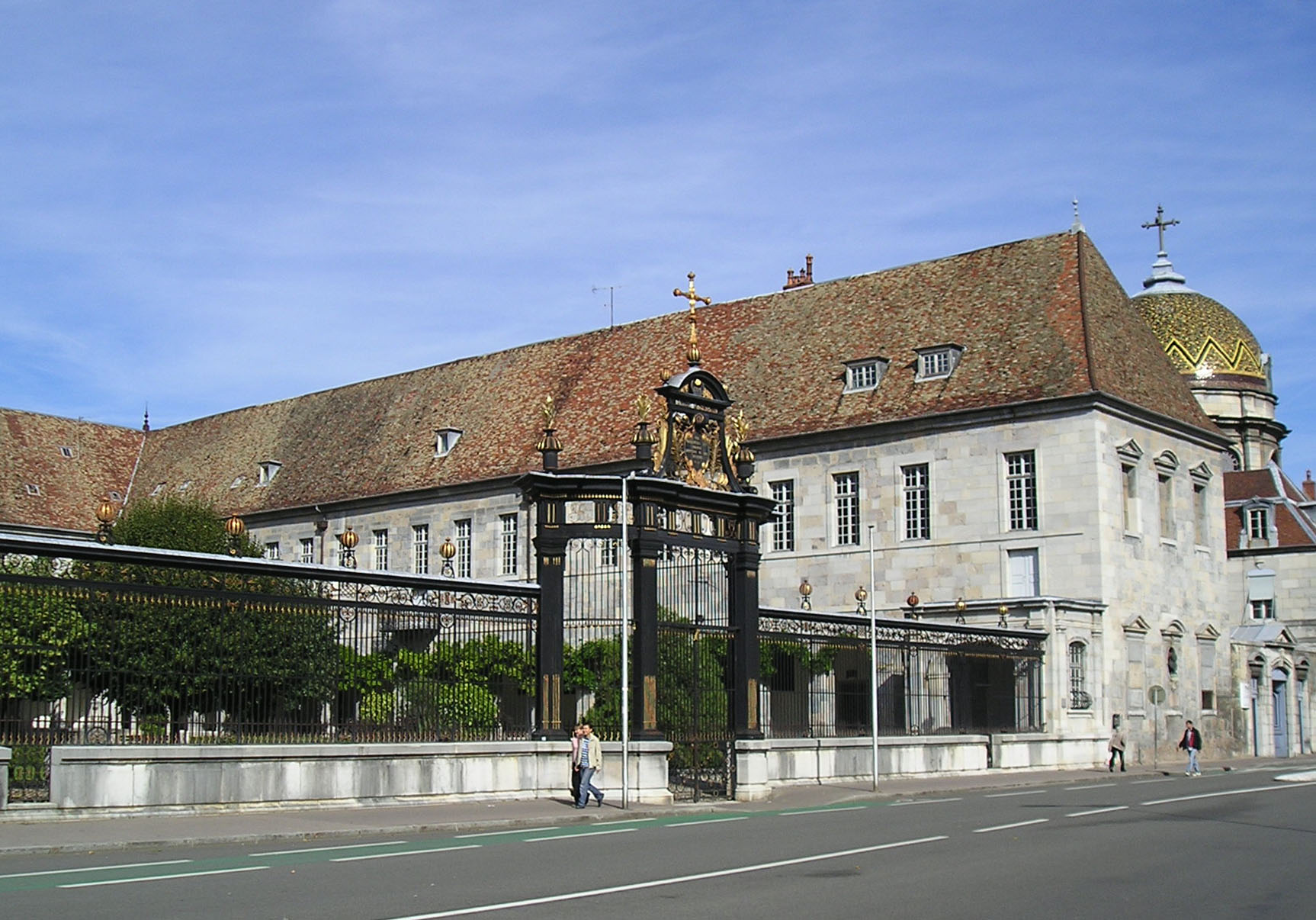
Former Saint-Jacques hospital.

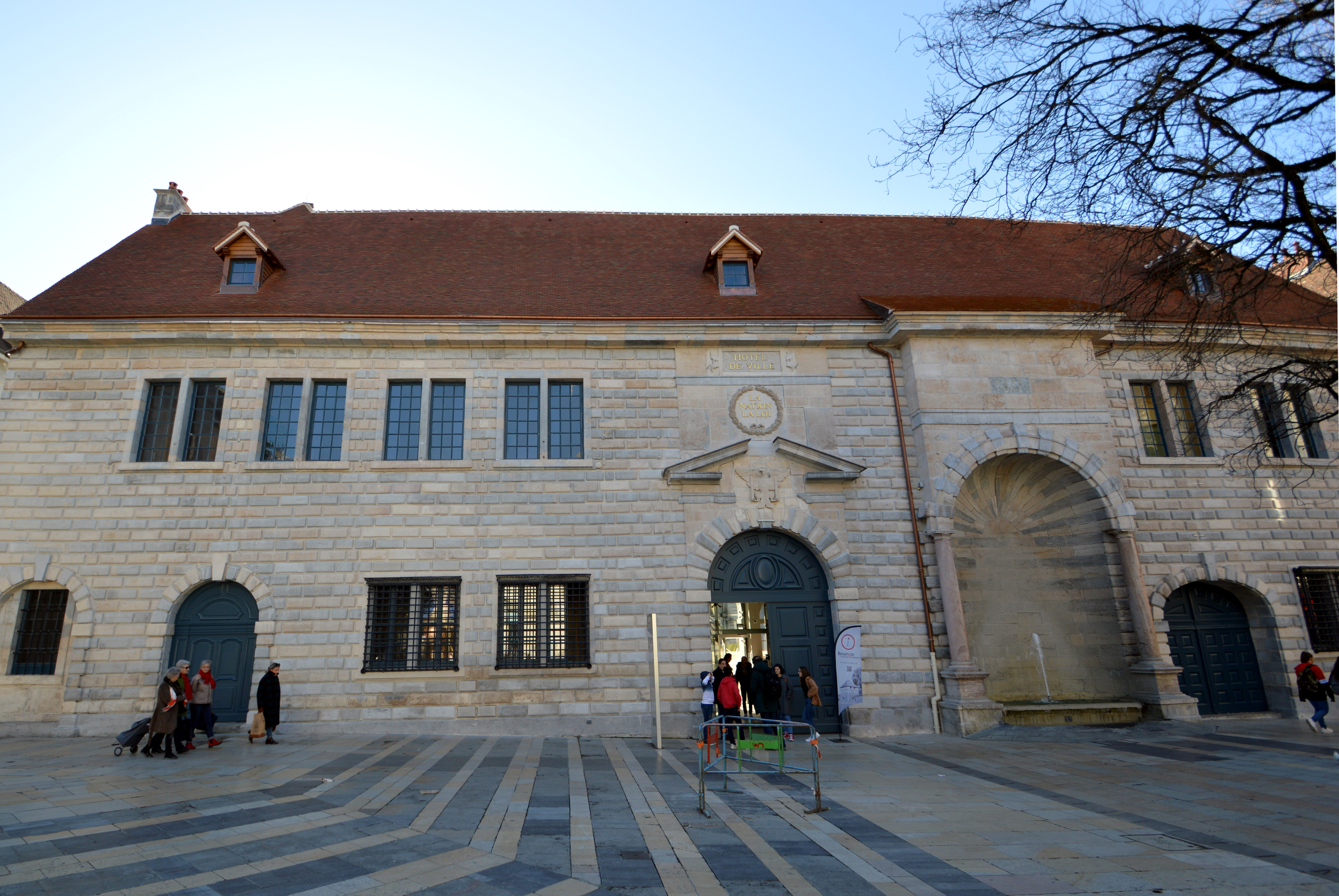
Hôtel de Ville (city hall).

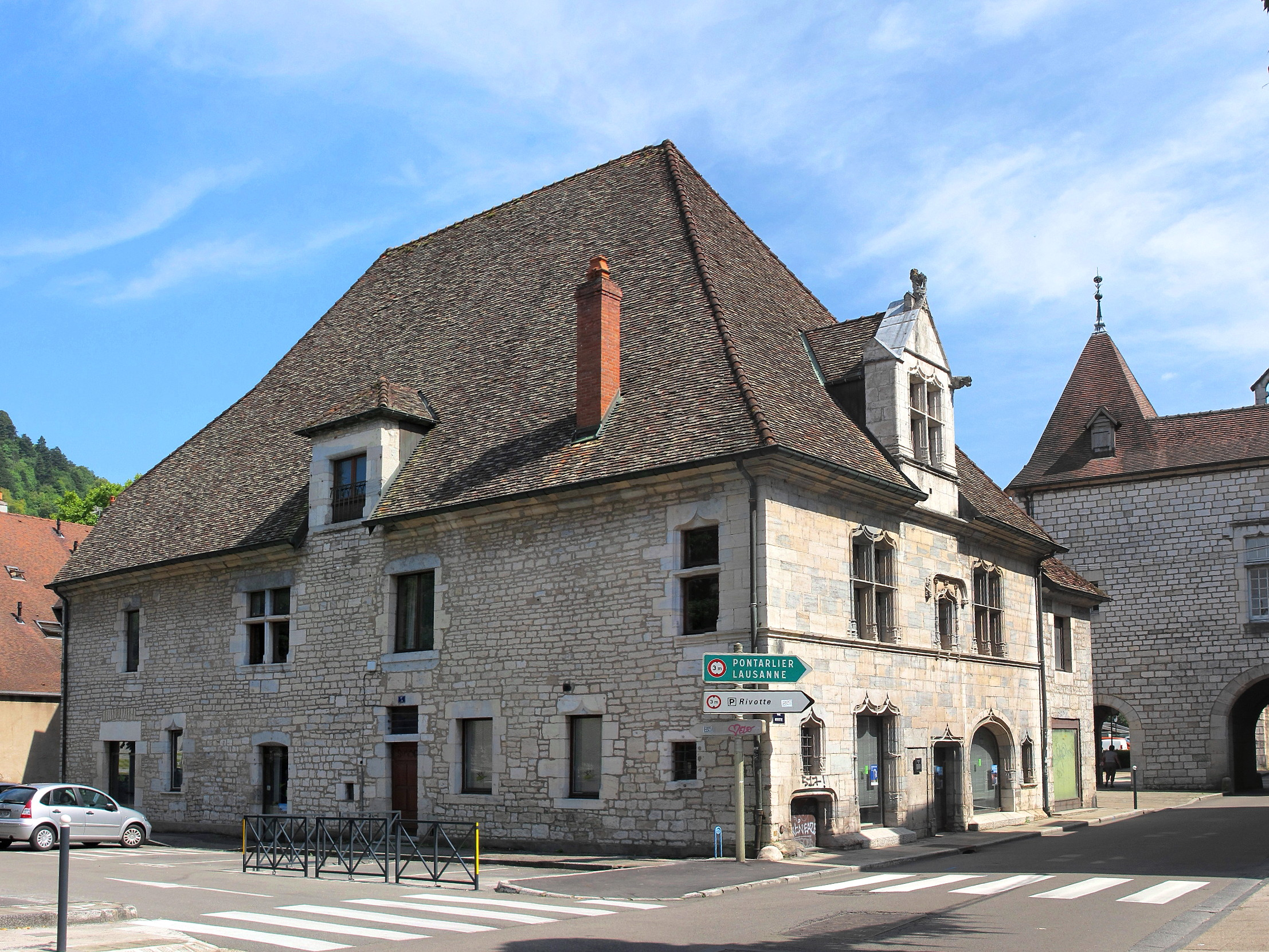
Hôtel Mareschal.

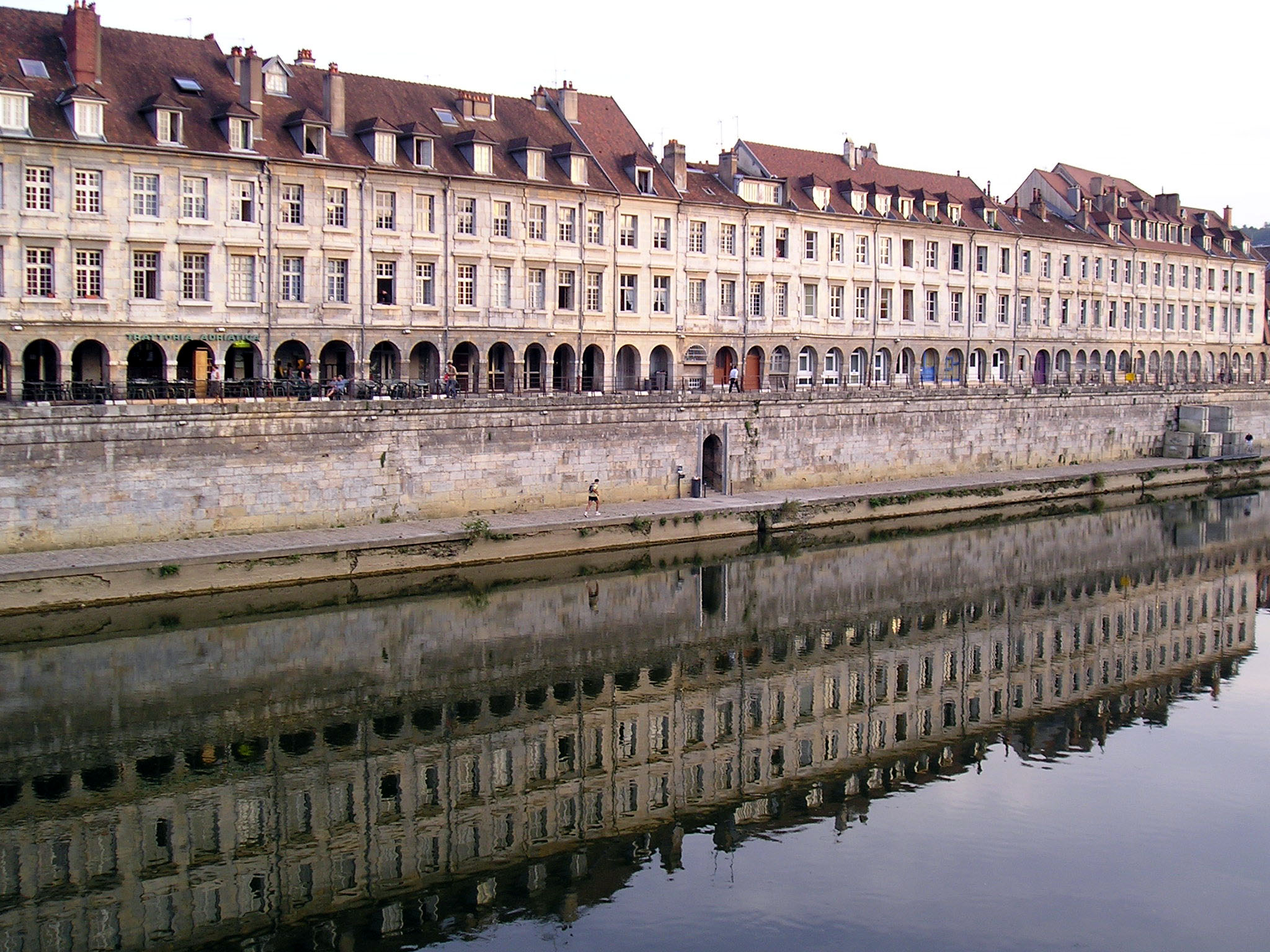
Vauban Quay.

During the Age of Enlightenment, the town's urban planning underwent major transformations and the construction of remarkable buildings, notably due to its new status as capital. The Hôtel de l'Intendance, currently prefecture of the Doubs departement, was built from 1771 to 1778 at the request of the intendant Charles André de Lacoré. The plans were drawn up by the great Parisian architect Victor Louis and the work directed by the bisontin architect Nicolas Nicole. It adopts the traditional plan of private mansions, with a main courtyard with a facade made up of six Ionic columns surmounted by a pediment and a garden at the rear of the building whose facade is decorated with a rotunda jutting out slightly. on the garden. The Théâtre Ledoux is an order from Monsieur de Lacoré to Claude-Nicolas Ledoux who drew up the plans and entrusted the construction to Claude-Joseph-Alexandre Bertrand which began in 1778 and ended with its inauguration on 9 August 1784 under the crook of Louis V Joseph of Bourbon-Condé. With a capacity of 2,000 seats, it was considered very innovative, as it had a seated parterre, an amphitheater hall without boxes, and it was the first in the world to have an orchestra pit. On 29 April 1958 a dramatic fire completely destroyed the interior and the roof of the building. The walls are the only witnesses that have survived, including the facade and its six monumental columns. Many mansions also attest to the prosperity of the city during this period. The Hotel Terrier de Santans was built between 1770 and 1772 for the Marquis Terrier de Santans, first president of parliament, by the architect Claude Bertrand. Other eminent families call on the greatest architects for their homes: the Hôtels Petit de Marivat, de Magnoncourt, Boistouset, de Courbouzon, de Clévans, de Camus, Querret, Terrier, and de Rosières.

If the thermal baths of Besançon were completely destroyed in the 1950s, the city retains a number of buildings emblematic of its thermal past: the Grand Hôtel des Bains inaugurated in 1893, the municipal casino installed in a Belle Époque-style building inaugurated in 1882 or the Kursaal opened in 1893. It was also during this period that the astronomical observatory and the Café du Commerce were erected, a brasserie from the second half of the 19th century with a rich interior decor in the Belle Époque style.

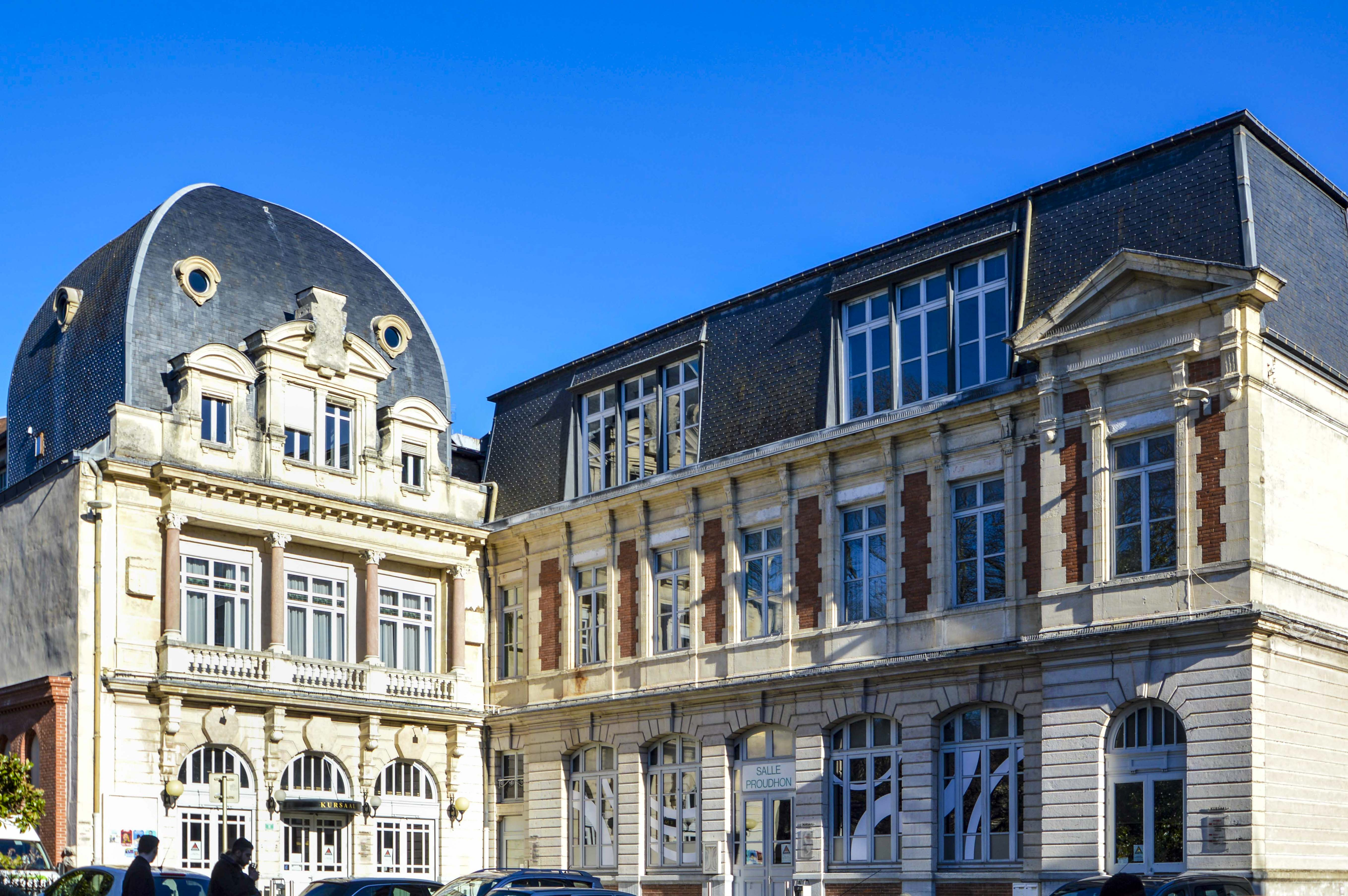
The Kursaal.

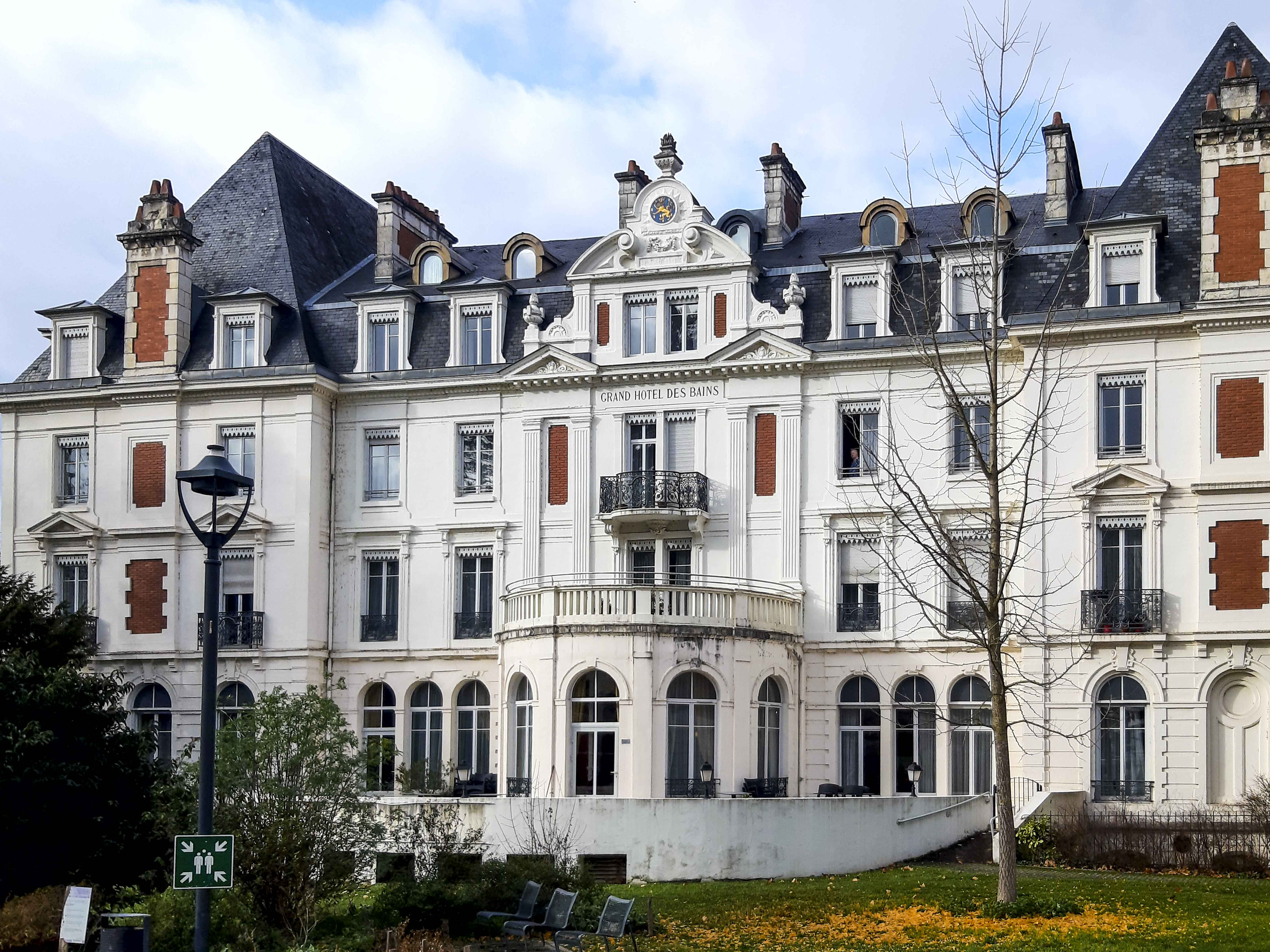
Grand Hôtel des Bains.

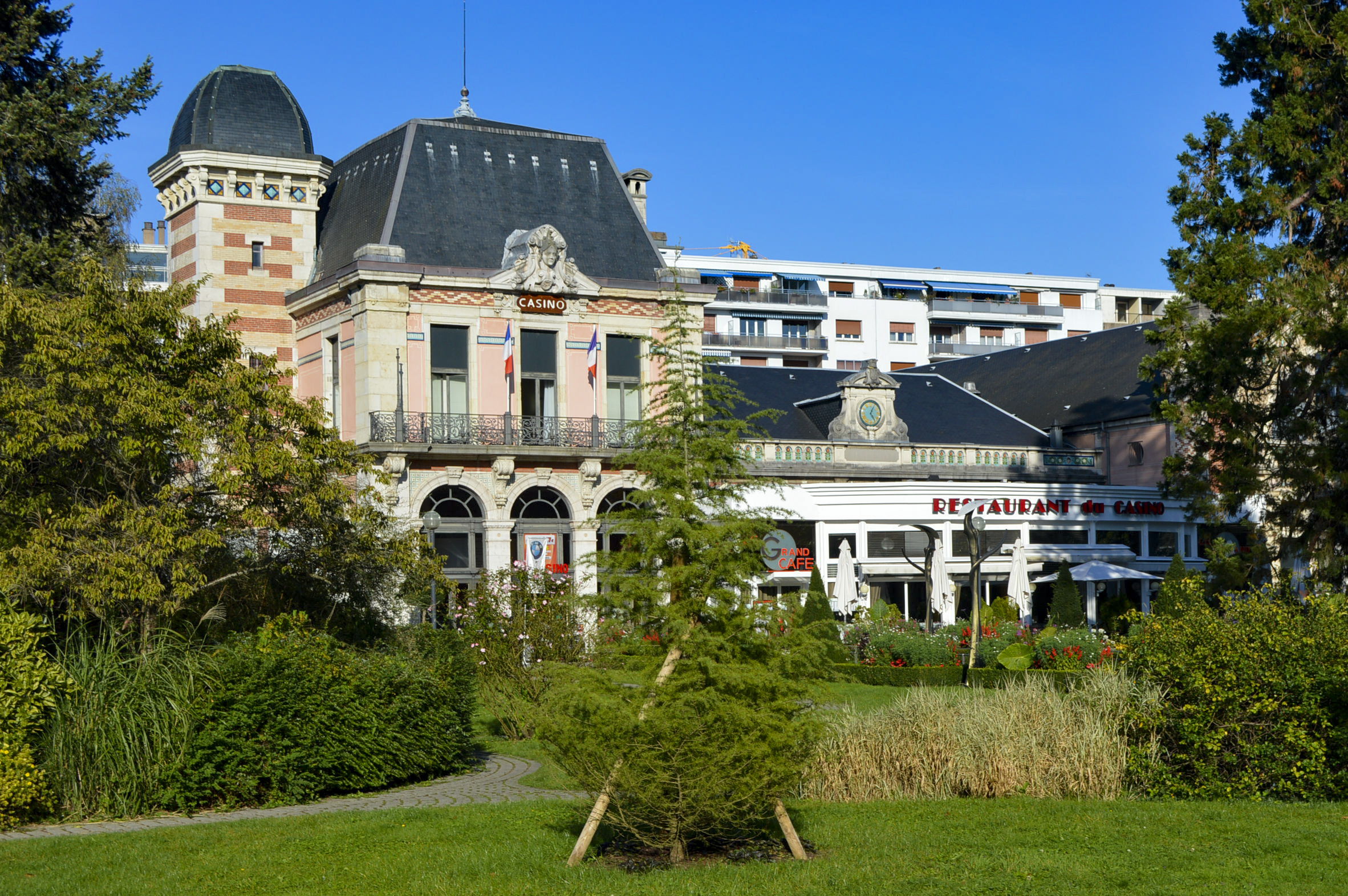
Casino.

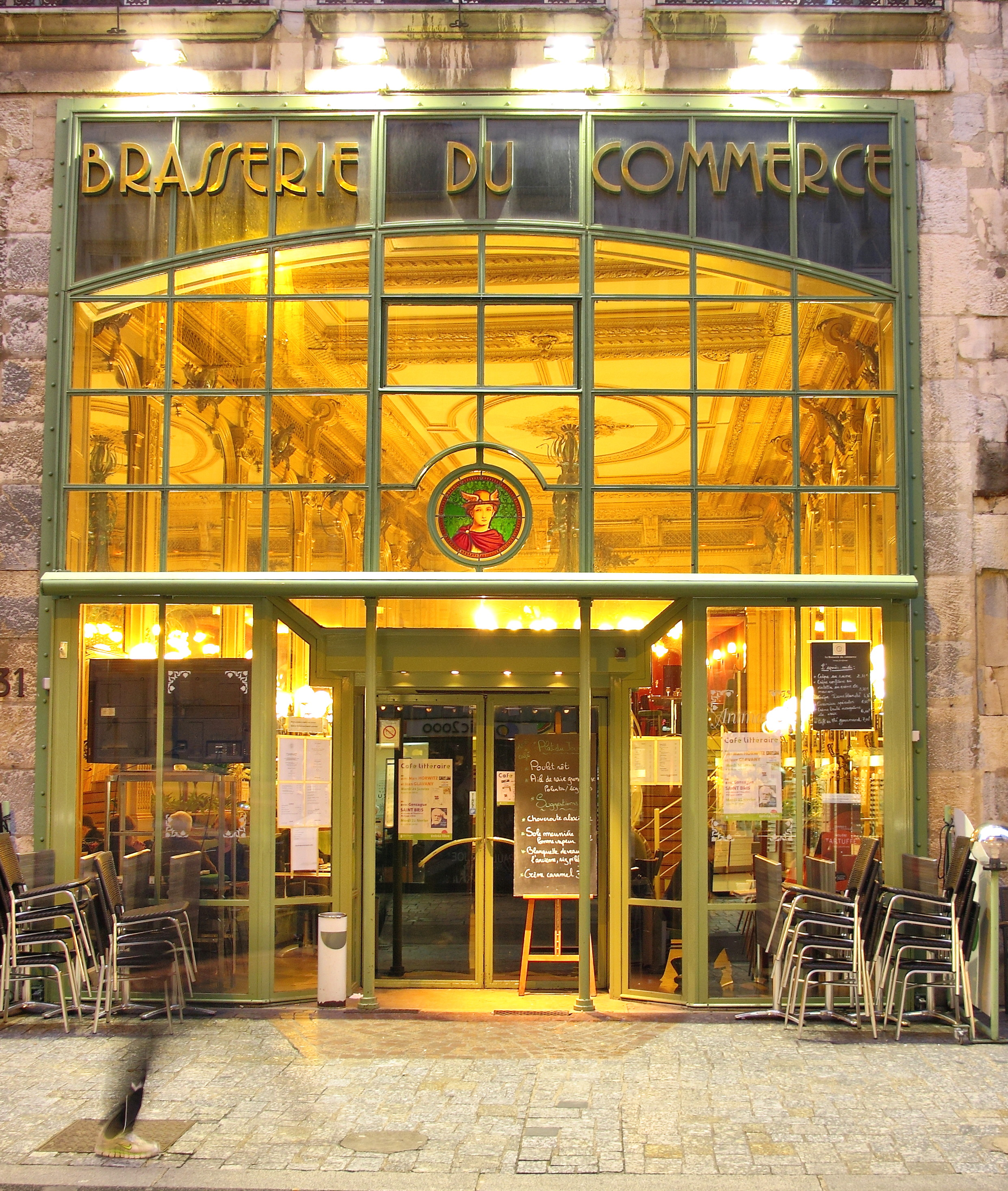
Brasserie du Commerce.

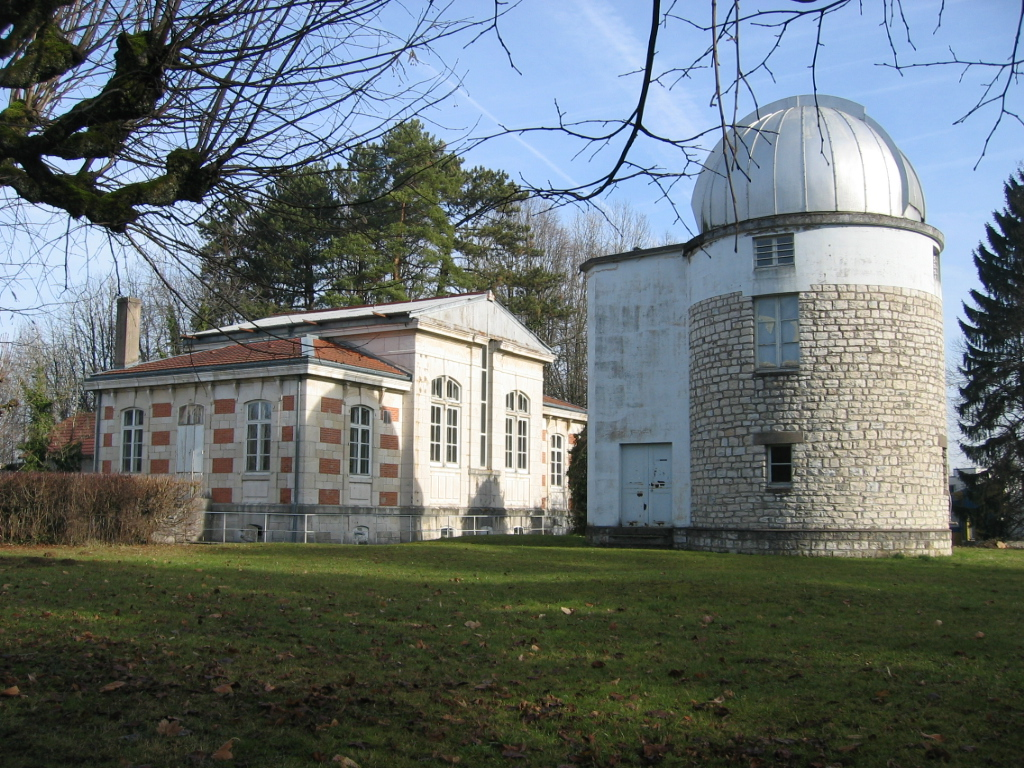
The observatory.

Besançon's specialization in watchmaking has also left its mark on the city's heritage. The astronomical clock located inside St. John's cathedral was commissioned in 1858 by Cardinal Mathieu from Auguste-Lucien Vérité. Composed of 30,000 mechanical parts, 57 dials and presenting 122 all interdependent indications, it is considered a masterpiece of its kind and classified as a Historic Monument in 1991. The National School of Watchmaking was built from 1928 to 1932 by the architect Paul Guadet. This imposing Art Deco building with a monumental clock on its facade now houses the Lycée Jules-Haag. The Dodane watch factory, completed in 1943, is an L-shaped reinforced concrete building whose construction was entrusted to the architect Auguste Perret who also designed the interior decor elements. It has a private garden with swimming pool and tennis court. In the twenty-first century, two monumental clocks, works by Bisontin Philippe Lebru from the Utinam workshop, were installed on the facade of the Besançon Museum of Fine Arts and inside the Besançon Franche-Comté TGV station.

In addition to the watchmaking heritage, other buildings with notable architecture were built during the twentieth and twenty-first centuries. The Canot university campus was built from 1929 by the architect René Tournier and inaugurated by the President of the Republic Albert Lebrun in 1933. It was the first university residence in France. The Higher Institute of Fine Arts was built between 1970 and 1974 to plans by the Catalan architect Josep Lluís Sert. The Cité des Arts inaugurated in 2013 is the work of the Japanese architect Kengo Kuma.

=== Parks and gardens ===
With 5,950 acres (9.30 sq mi; 24.1 km^{2}) of urban open spaces, including 4,942 acres (7.722 sq mi; 20.00 km^{2}) of forests, Besançon is considered the first green city in France with 204 m2 of green spaces per capita. The Forest of Chailluz, covering 4,015 acres (6.273 sq mi; 16.25 km^{2}), represents a quarter of the total area of the commune. The city is the owner of this mainly deciduous forest, which includes a wildlife park and a fitness trail in addition to numerous trails. The historic center is entirely surrounded by green spaces. To the west of the old town, on the left bank of the Doubs, are the Jardins de la Gare-d'Eau: in 1833, the construction of the Rhone-Rhine Canal led the city to create a small port river shipping but it quickly fell into disuse after the opening of a canal tunnel under the citadel. The 5 acres (0.0078 sq mi; 0.020 km^{2}) park around the basin is currently owned by the departmental council of Doubs. The Chamars Promenade, attached to these gardens but further north, built in the fourth quarter of the eighteenth century, owes its name to the contraction of Champ de Mars (Field of Mars). It was at first a marshland separated into two parts by an arm of the River Doubs: the big and the small Chamars. Vauban, judging this place vulnerable, fortified it with the help of ramparts and bastions. The city obtained permission to turn this space into a promenade in 1739. The architect Bertrand remodeled it between 1770 and 1778 by incorporating a café, public baths, an aviary of rare birds, waterfalls, a botanical garden and many plantings. It largely disappeared after 1830 with the leveling of the inner rampart and the creation of the Gare d'Eau port. A public garden was refurbished between 1978 and 1982. The only surviving elements of the former Chamars Promenade are the two guard houses, some plane trees, and the stone vases of the sculptor Jean-Baptiste Boutry.

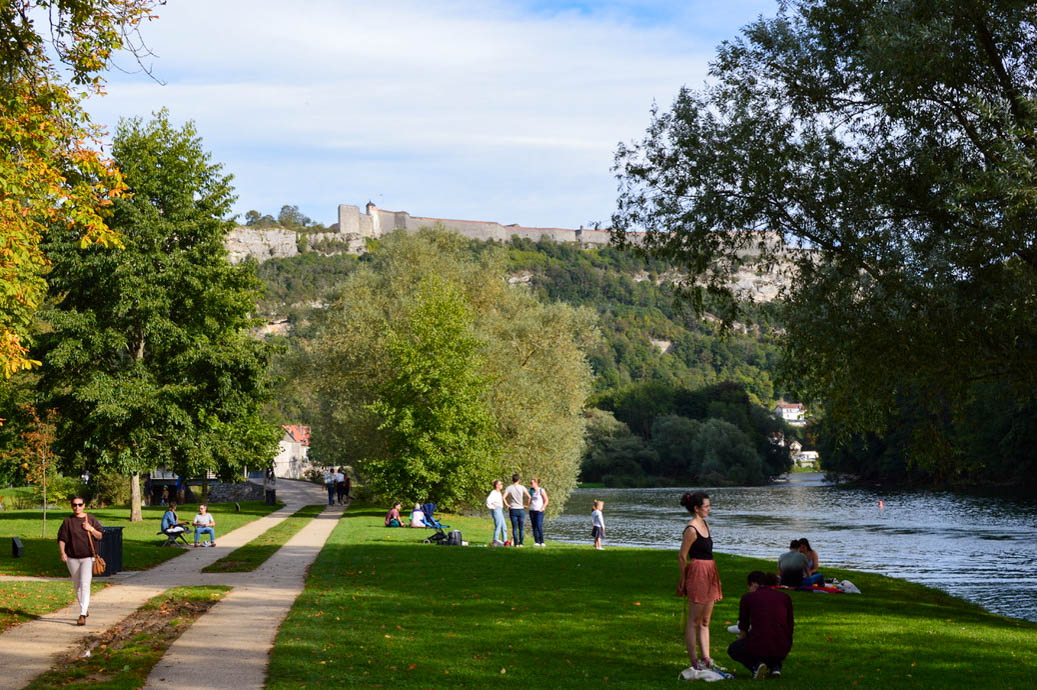
Jardins de la Gare d'Eau.

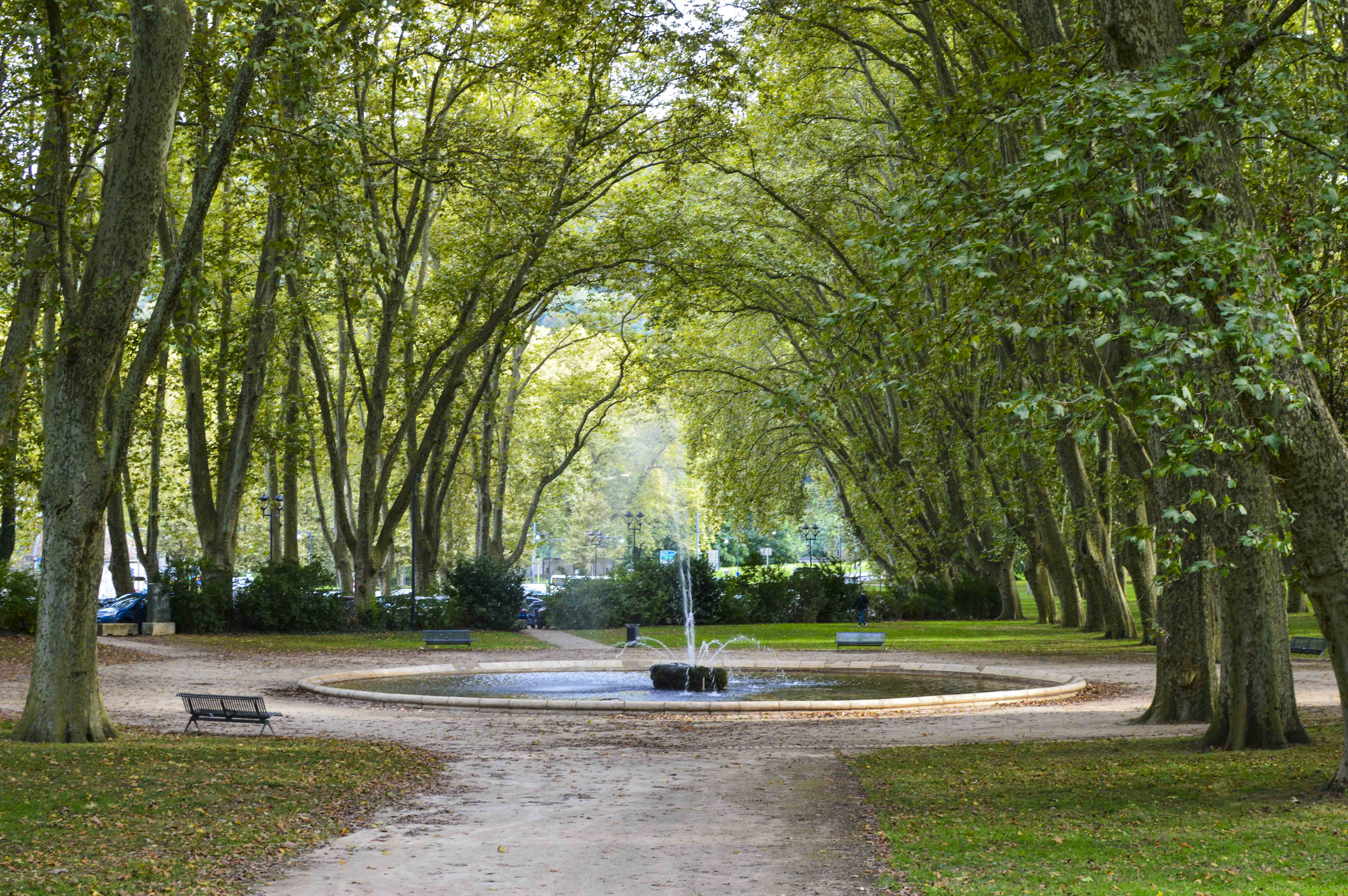
Promenade Chamars.

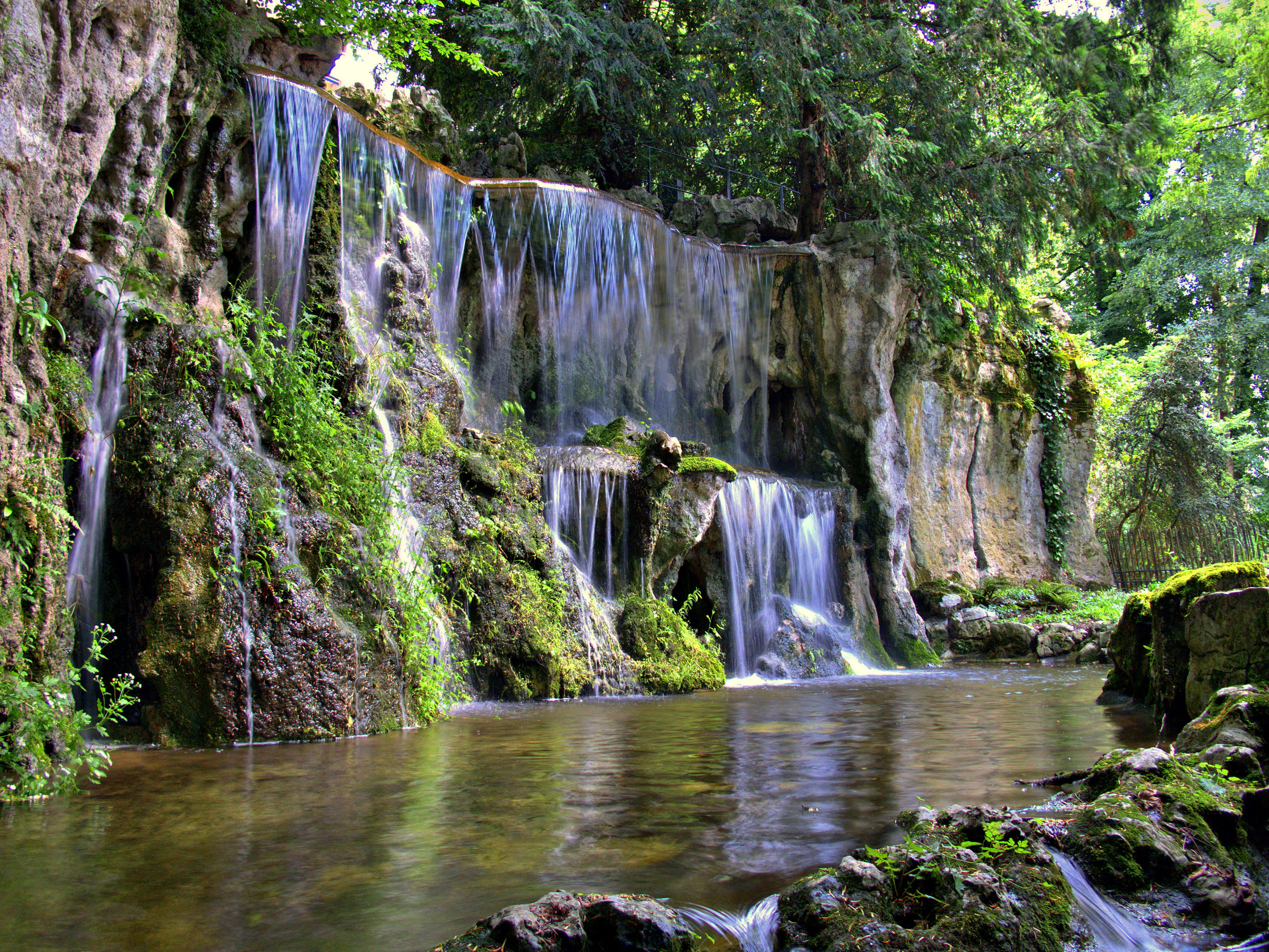
Promenade Micaud.

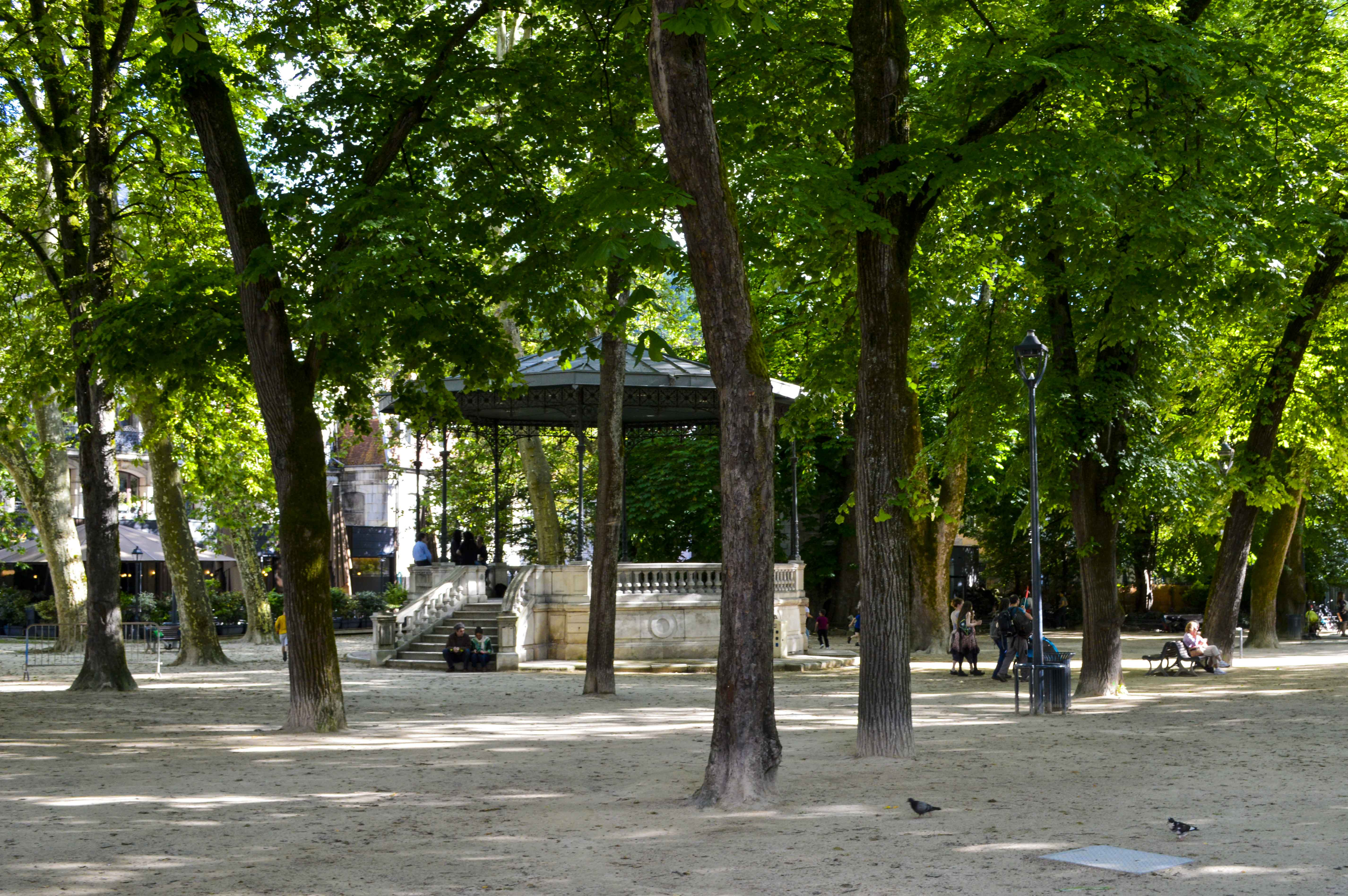
Promenade Granvelle.

North of the historic district of Battant, on the right bank of the River Doubs, the Glacis Promenade, created in the middle of the nineteenth century, is the work of the landscape architect Brice Michel and the architect Boutterin. Right in the heart of this district, the Clos Barbisier is a garden created in 1988 and presenting an important variety of roses. The green belt extends east of the old town, still on the right bank of the River Doubs, by the Promenade of Helvetia which houses a botanical garden called Jardin des Sens et des Senteurs (Garden of Senses and Scents) realized in 1987, accessible to the visually impaired thanks to its plants and shrubs with certain sensory features (smell, touch), and Braille signs. Directly to the south is the Micaud Promenade, which has been progressively developed over 7 acres (0.011 sq mi; 0.028 km^{2}) from 1843 on plans by architect Alphonse Delacroix. It is named after Jules Micaud, the mayor who promoted the project. It includes more than four hundred trees, including a southern magnolia and a European beech, a bandstand, a pond, and several sculptures. The Jardins du Casino, a public garden with flowering lawns and tree-lined avenues, is directly on the other side of Edouard Droz Avenue, which runs along Micaud Promenade.

In the heart of the historic center, the Promenade Granvelle is the former private garden of the sixteenth century Granvelle Palace, which the municipality acquired in 1712 and which was opened to the public in 1728. The architect Bertrand redeveloped it into a public garden from 1775 to 1778. It includes a bandstand, an artificial cave, a Wallace fountain, statues of Victor Hugo and Auguste Veil-Picard, the portal of the church of the convent of the Great Carmelites, and a neoclassical colonnade, a remnant of a refreshment pavilion. The first botanical garden in Besançon was created in 1580. It then occupied more than ten different sites, including the current location of Place Leclerc since 1957. The Parc de l'Observatoire, created in 1904 at the request of the director of the astronomical observatory Auguste Lebeuf, is home to a purple beech, a weeping beech, chestnut and pine trees.

A statue of Henri Bouchot stands in Besançon's Henri-Bouchot square. It was originally in bronze but was melted down by the Vichy régime. The replacement in stone was made by Georges Saupique.

== Culture ==
=== Museums and galleries ===
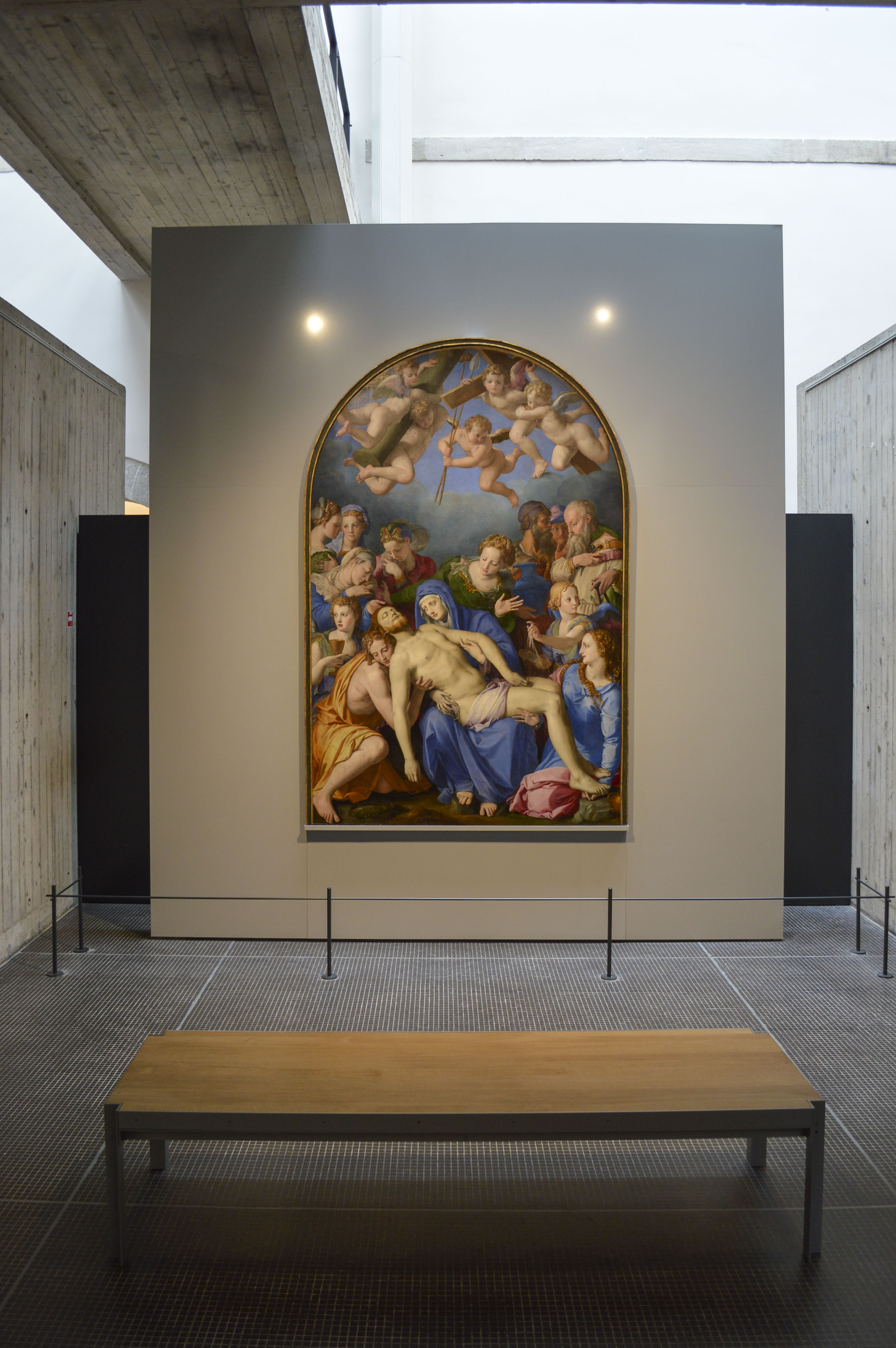
Museum of Fine Arts and Archeology

There are five museums in Besançon that all bear the designation "Museum of France". Besançon has one of the finest city art galleries in France outside Paris. The Museum of Fine Arts and Archeology, created in 1694, was the first museum created in France and predates The Louvre by almost a century. It has benefited from a remarkable series of bequests over time.

In the 1960s the architect Luis Miquel, a pupil of Le Corbusier, totally rebuilt the building. The building's interior takes the form of a gently rising concrete walkway that takes visitors up from classical antiquity to the modern age. Among the museum's treasures are a fine collection of classical antiquities and ancient Egyptian artifacts, as well as a very rich collection of paintings including works by Bellini, Bronzino, Tintoretto, Titian, Rubens, Jordaens, Ruisdael, Cranach, Zurbarán, Goya, Philippe de Champaigne, Fragonard, Boucher, David, Ingres, Géricault, Courbet, Constable, Bonnard, Matisse, Picasso and many others.

The Musée du Temps (Museum of Time), inaugurated in 2002, was formerly the City's History Museum. Located in the Granvelle Palace, its concept is unique in Europe, grouping watch collections (watches, sundials, hourglasses, all means of measuring time ...) and the funds of the history museum (paintings, engravings). In addition, three museums are grouped inside the Vauban citadel.

The Museum of Resistance and Deportation has been open since 1971 and is one of the largest in its category at the national level. It consists of twenty rooms, retracing the themes related to the Second World War (Nazism, the Occupation, the Vichy regime, the Resistance, Liberation, Deportation) through photographs, texts, documents and original collectibles. The establishment also has two rooms dedicated to artists whose works were made in concentration camps.

The Comtois Museum, installed in 1961 in the Royal Front, presents regional arts and traditions through sixteen permanent exhibition halls with collections of more than 20,000 objects, mainly from the nineteenth and early twentieth centuries.

The Museum of Natural History, created in 1959 under the leadership of Mayor Jean Minjoz, presents varied backgrounds in a small evolutionary course around collections of natural sciences (naturalized animals, herbaria ...); it also presents live animals in four sectors (zoo, insectarium, noctarium and aquarium). Besançon is also home to the birthplace of Victor Hugo, presenting the humanist political commitment of the writer. The Cité des Arts exhibits part of the works of the regional fund of contemporary art of Franche-Comté.

=== Performing arts centers ===
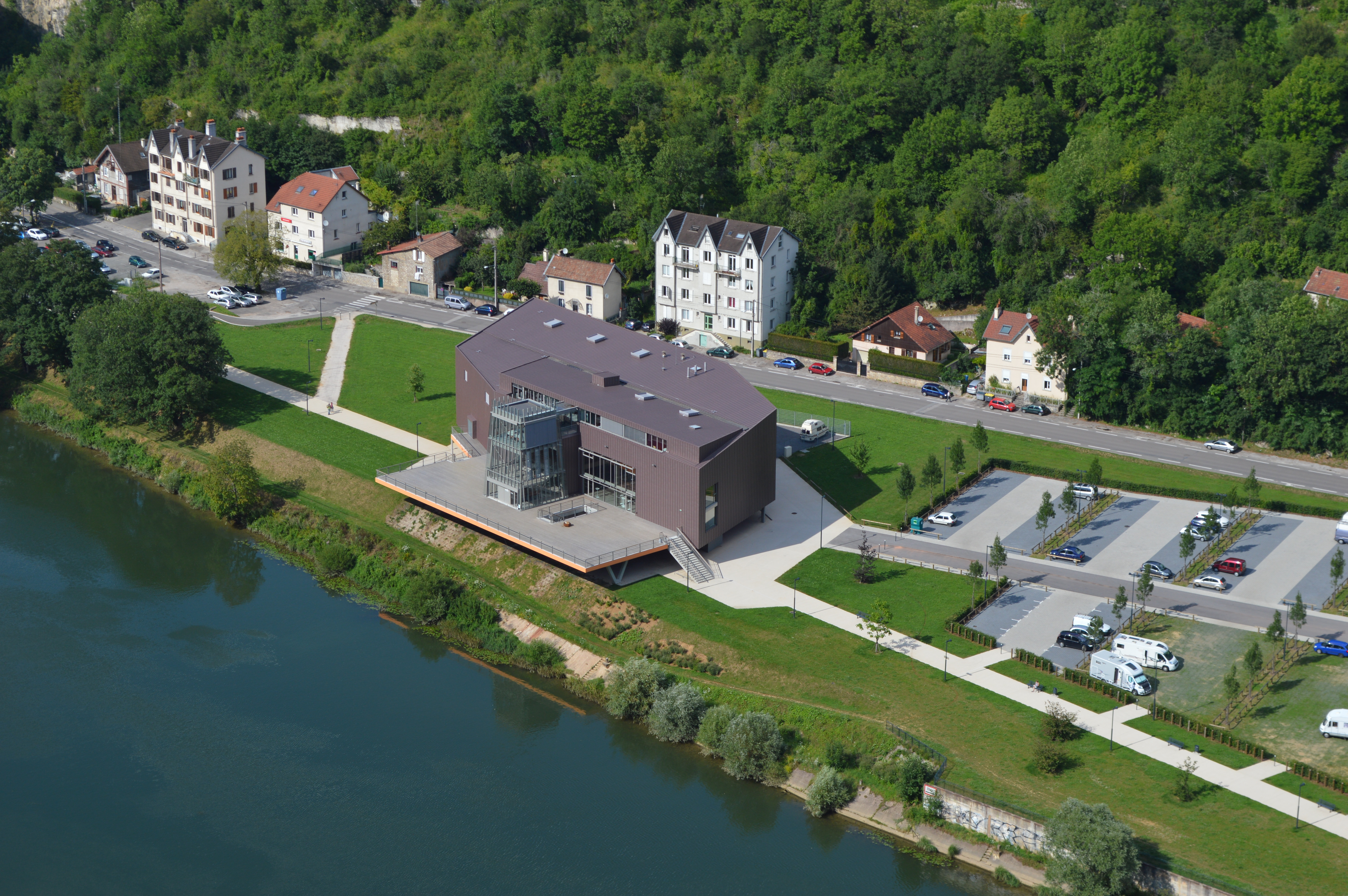
La Rodia concert hall

The city is home to a National Center for Dramatic Art, the Centre dramatique national Besançon Franche-Comté created in 1972. This theater installed in the former ballroom of the Casino has a capacity of 337 seats. The Scène nationale de Besançon performs since 2012 in two facilities including the Théâtre de l'Espace and the Théâtre Ledoux. The Théâtre Ledoux was inaugurated in 1784 and can accommodate 1100 people. Besançon also has smaller structures. The Scénacle located in the Saint-Jean district is a small theater with a capacity of about 100 seats that offers plays and concerts by the troupe or regional artists. On campus, the 150-seat Petit Théâtre de la Bouloie welcomes student projects to promote artistic and cultural practice (university theater, university choir...), artistic residencies of young companies, professional shows proposed by the partner structures and shows of young companies.

The Kursaal is the result of the will to offer entertainment and shows to spa guests of the spa resort of Besançon-les-Bains created in 1891 and military garrison in the city. The Kursaal-Circus opened at the end of 1893, but the promoter's finances, Madame Veuve Pellegrin, did not allow her to reimburse the expenses incurred. The city acquired it in 1895 and the Kursaal became the city's concert hall. It closes in 1970 for reasons of obsolescence, before being renovated from 1979 and reopened in September 1982. A conference room with 360 seats, called Petit Kursaal was also created in the basement. The main hall, known as Grand Kursaal, has two balconies and a dome ceiling decorated with frescoes reminiscent of the circus arts. Its capacity can go up to 1,038 seats including 450 on both balconies.

Bands play throughout the year at La Rodia, located in the Prés-de-Vaux neighborhood. It includes a large 900-seat theater and a 330-seat "club" hall as well as two creative studios. The Micropolis Exhibition Center houses a modular hall with a capacity of 2,200 to 6,500 seats, where the majority of artists and bands on national and international tours are performing.

The city is home to the Victor Hugo Franche-Comté Orchestra.

=== Cinema ===
There are two multiplex cinemas, the Mégarama Beaux-Arts in the historic district and Mégarama École-Valentin in the suburban area. The Cinéma Victor-Hugo is a smaller cinema promoting indie movies, located in the city center.

=== Annual cultural events and fairs ===
The city of Besançon hosts many festive and cultural events.

Several music festivals punctuate the year, the most emblematic and the oldest of which is the Besançon Franche-Comté International Music Festival, created in 1948 and held every year in September. This festival honors the symphonic repertoire, chamber music and recitals. It was completed in 1951 by the International Contest of Young Conductors held every two years (odd years), one of the most prestigious of the discipline which counts among its laureates Seiji Ozawa, Gerd Albrecht, Michel Plasson or Zdeněk Mácal.

The Festival Détonation is another highlight of September: created in 2012 and organized by La Rodia, its programming mixes pop music, electronic music and interactive mapping installations.

Initiated in 2007, the GéNéRiQ Festival takes place in February in five cities: Belfort, Besançon, Dijon, Montbéliard and Mulhouse. Its programming is also focused on new musical trends such as electro clubbing, mediterranean surf, free metal, electro blues, alternative hip hop or neo ghetto folk.

Created in 1981, the Jazz and improvised music festival in Franche-Comté offers concerts in Besançon and other towns in the region in June.

The Circasismic Festival, held in May since 2015, presents a program of electro, dub and rock music as well as circus and street theater shows.

The Orgue en ville festival, created in 2009, offers about twenty concerts around the organ in religious buildings of Besançon and its agglomeration. It takes place between the end of June and the beginning of July.

The Besançon-Montfaucon Festival offers musical works played on period instruments.

The Foire Comtoise is a trade fair and a travelling funfair held in the Micropolis exhibition center. This event created in 1922 was originally an agricultural fair. It now hosts around 600 exhibitors and 140,000 visitors around the Feast of the Ascension weekend. Each year, a country or a community is a guest of honor and presents its crafts and its customs and traditions through shows.

Since 1995, the Gourmet Instants market has been held on the Granvelle Promenade in September and showcases local gastronomic products.

The Christmas market in Besançon has been spreading throughout December since 1993, while a carnival parade has been held since 1978, bringing together 20,000 to 30,000 people each year in the streets of the city center.

The Grand Besançon Métropole book festival (Livres dans la Boucle) take place in September. Running over three days, it hosted in 2018 more than 200 authors and 30,000 visitors.

An African cinema festival called Lumières d'Afrique has been held in November since 1996.

Bien Urbain is a manifestation of street art and contemporary art in the public space held in June since 2011.

In the field of theater, Besançon has two festivals. The Festival de Caves has been offering shows since 2006 in the cellars of the city. Born in Besançon, the concept of this festival has since spread in many cities in France and Europe.

Since 2018, the Festival of World Languages and Cultures has been the heir to the International University Theater Meetings, which celebrated their 25th edition in 2017.

=== Media ===
- Radio BIP. Originally operating as a pirate radio station from 1977 to 1978, refounded in 1981 as a "free radio".
- South radio. Created in 1982 for the Algerian and Arab community.
- Radio Shalom Besançon. Radio of the Jewish Community of Besançon.
- RCF Besançon. Local edition of RCF, for the Roman Catholic Archdiocese of Besançon.
- Radio Campus Besançon. Local edition of Radio Campus France, for students.
- France Bleu Besançon. Local edition of France Bleu, generalist.
- France 3 Franche-Comté. Public TV.
- L'Est Républicain. Newspaper.

== Sports ==
The practice of sport in the agglomeration of Besançon is quite diverse, on the one hand because the municipality does not want to bet everything on one or two professional disciplines that would carry the colors of the city high, but rather to encourage its population to practice all disciplines, and on the other hand because the particular setting of the city (hills, cliffs, rivers) makes it possible to practice a wide range of outdoor sports such as hiking, mountain biking, climbing, rowing.

=== Sports venues ===
The Palais des sports Ghani-Yalouz, the largest indoor sports arena in the metropolitan area, was inaugurated in 1967 and refurbished in 2005. Its capacity is flexible, from 3,380 seats in handball configuration to 4,200 seats in basketball configuration. The main stadium is the Léo-Lagrange stadium, inaugurated in 1939 and renovated between 2003 and 2005. With a capacity of 11,500 seats, it exclusively hosts soccer matches. Three other stadiums are located in the town, the Rosemont stadium, the Orchamps stadium and the Henri Joran stadium in the Velotte district. The city has a single ice rink, the La Fayette ice rink, two indoor Olympic swimming pools (Mallarmé and La Fayette), two outdoor swimming pools (Chalezeule and Port Joint) and ten gyms. A large indoor climbing gym inaugurated in 2020 near the Léo-Lagrange stadium offers climbing routes that can reach up to 18 meters above the ground. The Centre des Cultures Urbaines de Besançon (CCUB) located in the Saint-Claude district is a 2,000 m2 indoor space inaugurated in 2019 and dedicated to boardsports (rollerblading, BMX, skateboarding) and balance practices (parkour, slacklining). An open-air skatepark is set up in the city center on the banks of the river Doubs in the Chamars area. Other notable facilities are located on the territory of peripheral municipalities. In Montfaucon, at the gates of Besançon, there is a free flight site for the practice of paragliding and hang-gliding as well as a cliff with nearly 150 climbing routes from 20 to 40 meters. The Golf de Besançon is an 18-hole golf course in the town of La Chevillotte.

=== Professional teams and sportspeople ===
In the field of team sports, the city is currently represented at the national level mainly in the discipline of handball. The Entente Sportive Bisontine Feminine (ESBF) club, founded in 1970, plays in the French Women's First League. It is the most successful club in the city with notably 4 French league titles and a European Cup. Grand Besançon Doubs Handball (GBDH), men's handball club, participated in 4 seasons in the first division and 26 seasons in the second division. It is playing in the second division for the 2020–2021 season.

In football, the city has two clubs playing in Championnat National 2, the fifth tier in the French football league system: Racing Besançon (RB) and Besançon Football (BF).

Basketball is present with the Besançon Avenir Comtois (BesAC) club, playing in Championnat de Nationale 3, fifth tier in the French basketball league system. Former Besançon BCD, now defunct, played nine seasons in the top-tier men's professional basketball league in France and counted Bruce Bowen, Tanoka Beard and Tony Farmer among its most famous players.

In the field of individual sports at professional and amateur level, the city stands out in boxing with Olympic medalist Khedafi Djelkhir, wrestling with Olympic medalist Ghani Yalouz, archery with Jean-Charles Valladont several times medalist at the World and European championship and silver medalist at the Rio Olympics, judo, cycling (Amicale Cycliste Bisontine), weightlifting (La Française de Besançon) or canoeing (Société Nautique Bisontine, 2nd club French). Besançon also hosts the Franche-Comté Judo Besançon club with 90 national podiums, 50 French Champion titles in all categories and 20 European and world podiums.

=== Sport events ===
Grand Besançon Métropole is organizing from 2019 a festival called Grandes Heures Nature devoted to outdoor sports such as hiking, trail running, canoeing, climbing, mountain biking and road cycling. It takes place over four days during the month of June. The city of Besançon is a regular stage city in the Tour de France bicycle race, which it hosted 18 times between 1903 and 2018. The Besançon Trail des Forts has been taking place since 2004 every year in May and offers four trail running races of 48, 28, 19 and 10 kilometers, the longest course being registered among the ten stages of the National Trail Tour.

== Transport ==
=== Road ===
Besançon is situated at the crossing of two major lines of communication, the NE-SW route that follows the valley of the river Doubs and links Germany and North Europe with Lyon and southwest Europe, and the N–S route linking northern France and the Netherlands with Switzerland. The city is served by the A36 motorway, which connects the German border with Burgundy.

=== Rail ===
Besançon is well connected with the rest of France by train. One can reach major destinations such as Paris, Dijon, Belfort, Mulhouse, Strasbourg, Lyon, Marseille, Montpellier and Lille directly. The city has some international connections to cities such as Basel in Switzerland, Frankfurt am Main and Freiburg im Breisgau in Germany and Luxembourg.

- Gare de Besançon-Viotte, the main railway station, sits in the centre of the city.
- Gare de Besançon Franche-Comté TGV is the high speed railway station and it sits some 10 km (6 mi) north of the city.

=== Tram ===
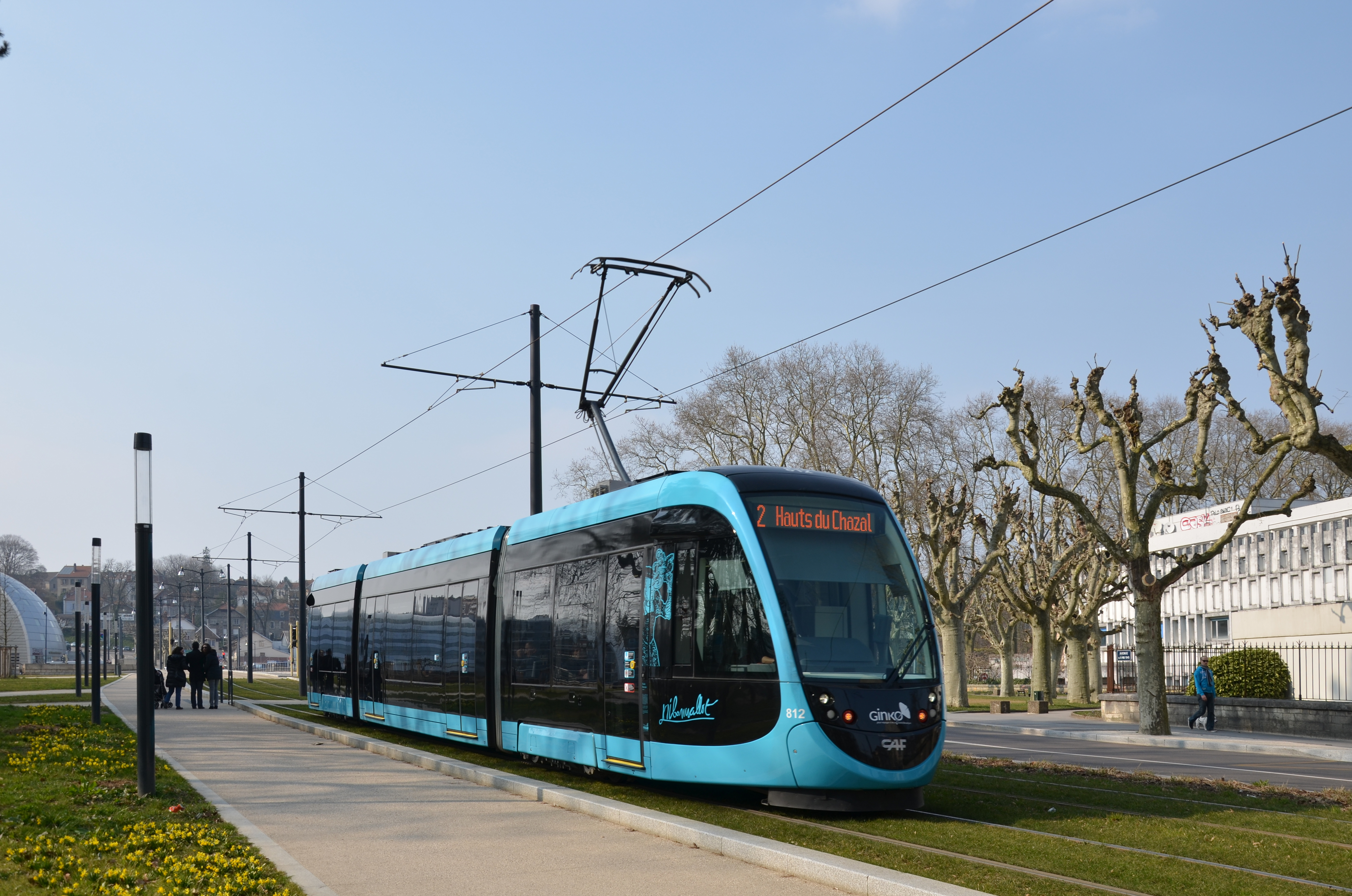
Tram in Besançon, Chamars.

A tramway commenced service in September 2014. The length of the line is 13 kilometres (8.1 mi) and the route follows a mainly southwest–northeast direction through the city between Hauts du Chazal and alternative destinations of Chalezeule ("parc Micaud") and the Besançon railway station at "Gare Viotte".

=== Bus ===
Bus services in Besançon and its suburbs are run by the Ginko company. It runs 58 bus lines and its fleet has about 240 buses. The network serves the 68 municipalities of the urban community.

=== Air ===
Besançon is served by Dole-Jura Airport, located 63 km (39 mi) south west of the city. However, the airport only provides flights to limited destinations. The nearest major airports are EuroAirport Basel-Mulhouse-Freiburg, located 165 km (103 mi) northeast, and Geneva Airport, located 175 km (109 mi) south of Besançon.

== Notable people ==
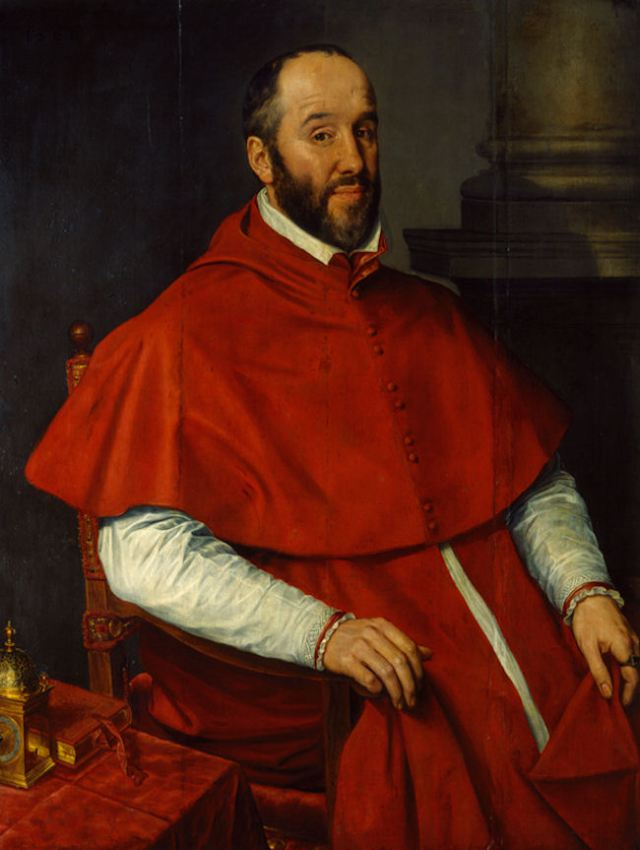
Portrait of Antoine Perrenot de Granvelle, 1561

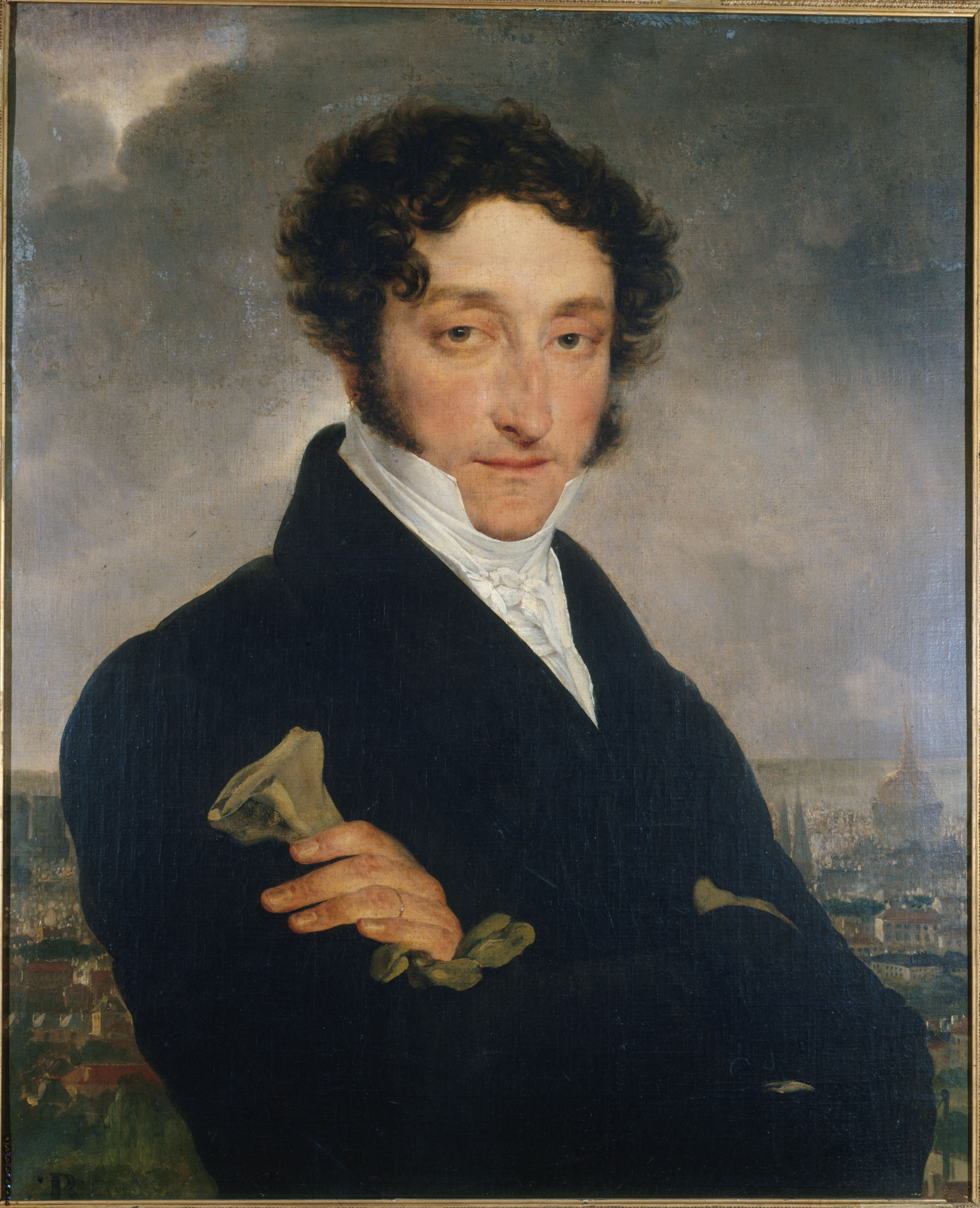
Portrait of Charles Nodier, ca.1830

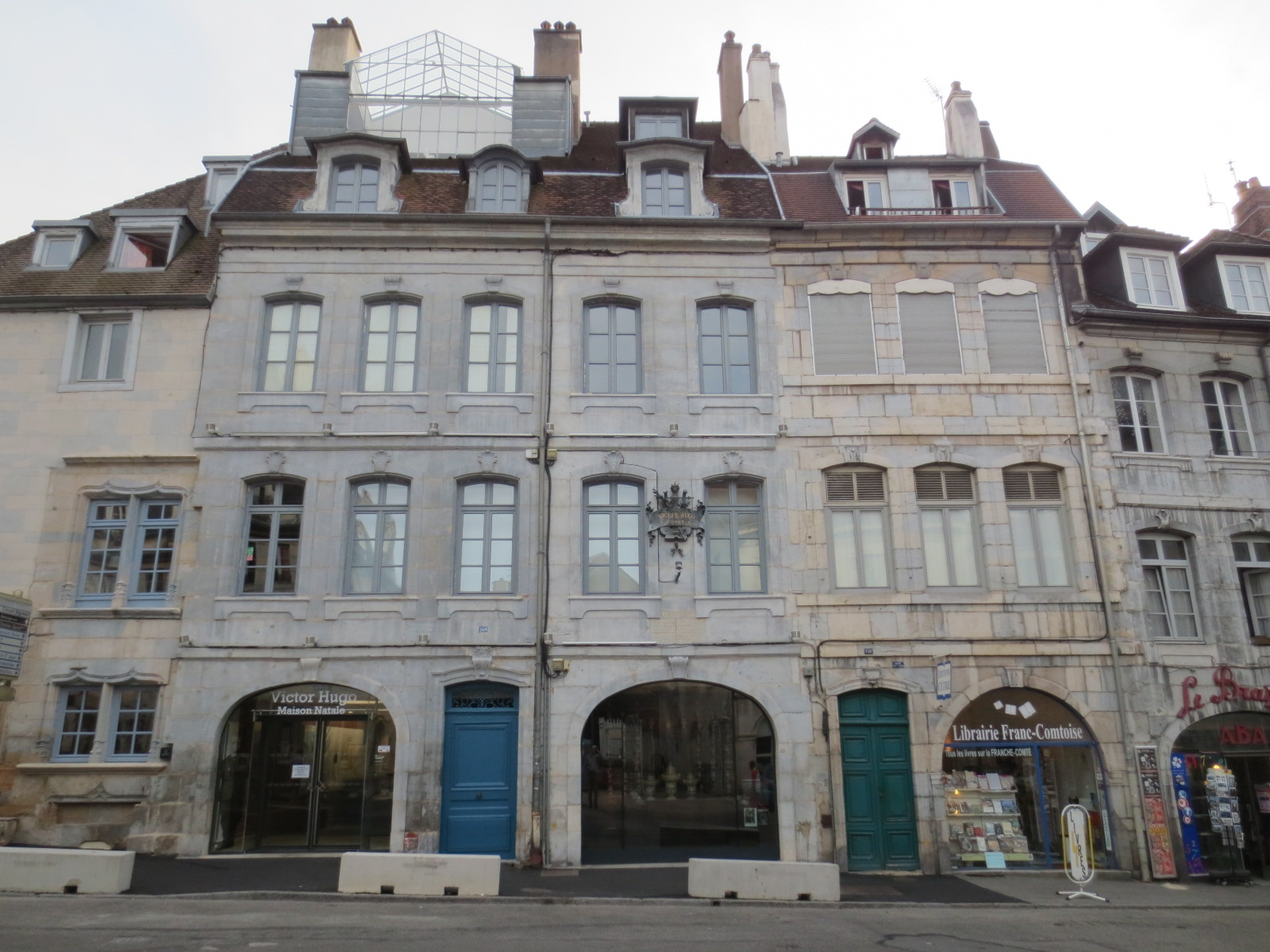
The birthplace of Victor Hugo in Besançon

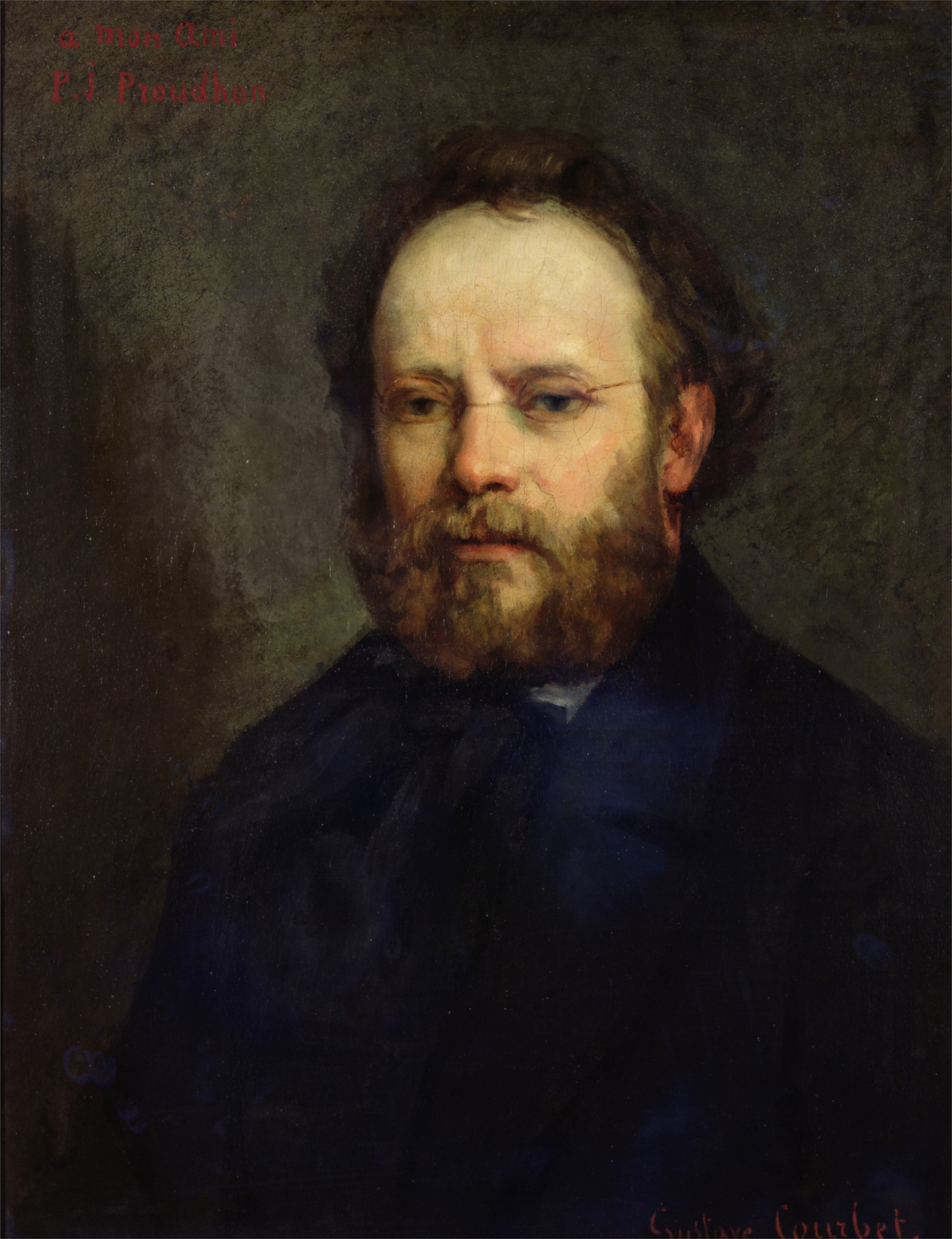
Portrait of Pierre-Joseph Proudhon, 1865

Besançon was the birthplace of:

- Claude Goudimel (1510–1572), musician, teacher of Palestrina, composer of Protestant hymns.
- Antoine Perrenot de Granvelle (1517–1586), cardinal, statesman and humanist.
- Jean-Jacques Boissard (1528–1602), an antiquary and Neo-Latin poet.
- Jean-Baptiste Besard (1567 – ca.1625), lawyer, Doctor of Medicine and composer for the lute
- Jean Mairet (1604–1686), dramatist.
- Jean-Baptiste Boisot (1638–1694), abbot and scholar
- Michel Blavet (1700–1768), flutist, composer
- Charles Fourier (1772–1837), inventor of socialist "phalansteries" (a self-contained utopian community building for 500–2000 people).
- Jean Joseph Antoine de Courvoisier (1775–1835), magistrate and politician.
- Charles-Étienne-François Ruty (1777–1828), comte, general, peer—commissioned into the army in 1793 and promoted to lt. general in 1813
- Charles Weiss (1779–1866), librarian and bibliographer
- Charles Nodier (1780–1844), writer. Leader of the Romantic movement.
- Claude Louis Séraphin Barizain (1783–1843), a French actor, known as Monrose.
- Jean Claude Eugène Péclet (1793–1857), physicist, gave his name to the Péclet number
- Victor Hugo (1802–1885), poet, dramatist and romance-writer.
- Charles de Bernard (1804–1850), a French writer.
- Pierre-Joseph Proudhon (1809–1865), politician, economist and author, theorist of anarchism.
- Adolphe Braun (1812–1877), early photographer
- Hilaire de Chardonnet (1838–1924), inventor of artificial silk
- Hippolyte Langlois (1839–1912), a French general, he wrote on military science.
- Alfred Nicolas Rambaud (1842–1905), a French historian.
- Henry Aron (1842–1885), journalist
- Louis-Jean Résal (1854–1920), engineer who built the Pont Mirabeau and the Pont Alexandre III in Paris
- Auguste and Louis Lumière (1862–1954) and (1864–1948), inventors of cinematography
- Émile Scaremberg (1863–1938), tenor
- Tristan Bernard (1866–1947), journalist and humorist
- Albert Seitz (1872–1937), composer and violist
- Marie-Louise Paris (1889–1969), French engineer who founded the Women's Polytechnic
- Ludovic Arrachart (1897–1933), aviator
- Fred Gerard (1924–2012), jazz trumpeter and composer
- Gabriel Plançon (1916–1943), French Resistance fighter.
- Georges Petetin (1920–2012), painter and sculptor
- Viviane Wade (born 1932), First Lady of Senegal (2000–2012)
- Bernard Blum (1938–2014), agronomist and founder of IBMA and ABIM
- Philippe Bender (born 1942), flutist and conductor
- Raymond Blanc (born 1949), chef
- Maurice Clerc (born 1949), mathematician
- Arnaud Courlet de Vregille (born 1958), painter
- Philippe Berta (born 1960), MP
- Olivier Maire (1960–2021), assassinated Catholic priest
- Sylvie Mamy (born ca.1965), musicologist
- Thomas Paris (born 1970), author
- Gaspard Augé (born 1979), one half of electronic music duo Justice

=== Sport ===
- Lucien Laurent (1907–2005), footballer
- Jean de Gribaldy (1922–1987), professional racing cyclist and directeur sportif
- Morrade Hakkar (born 1972), boxer
- Cyril Kali (born 1984), footballer
- Yohann Lasimant (born 1989), footballer
- Romain Grégoire (born 2003), professional road cyclist

and

- King Willem-Alexander of the Netherlands (born 1967) is the Lord of Besançon.

== Literary references ==
- Julius Caesar, in his account Commentarii de Bello Gallico gives a description of the antique city of Besançon, named Vesontio (first book, section 38):

[1.38] When he had proceeded three days' journey, word was brought to him that Ariovistus was hastening with all his forces to seize on Vesontio, which is the largest town of the Sequani, and had advanced three days' journey from its territories. Caesar thought that he ought to take the greatest precautions lest this should happen, for there was in that town a most ample supply of every thing which was serviceable for war; and so fortified was it by the nature of the ground, as to afford a great facility for protracting the war, inasmuch as the river Doubs almost surrounds the whole town, as though it were traced round it with a pair of compasses. A mountain of great height shuts in the remaining space, which is not more than 600 feet (180 m), where the river leaves a gap, in such a manner that the roots of that mountain extend to the river's bank on either side. A wall thrown around it makes a citadel of this [mountain], and connects it with the town.

- Gary Jennings's novel Raptor, which takes place in the 5th century AD, describes Vesontio lavishly.
- In Stendhal's novel Le rouge et le noir, Julien Sorel, the main character, studies for a while at the Catholic seminary at Besançon (first book, chapters 24 to 30):

Eventually he saw the white walls beyond the distant mountain; it was the citadel of Besançon. "What a difference", he said, sighing, "if I could come into this fine city as a sub-lieutenant of one of these regiments of the post." Besançon is not only one of the prettiest cities in France, but it abounds in brave and intelligent men. Julien, however, was only a little peasant, without any means of approaching distinguished personages.

- In the poem "This Century Was Two Years Old" (Les Feuilles d'automne; literally – "The Leaves of Autumn"), Victor Hugo evokes his birth in Besançon:

This century was two years old. Rome was replacing Sparta;
Already Napoleon was emerging from under Bonaparte.
And already the First Consul's tight mask
Had been split in several places by the Emperor's brow.
It was then that in Besançon, that old Spanish town,
Cast like a seed into the flying wind,
A child was born of mixed blood—Breton and Lorraine—
Pallid, blind and mute,...
That child, whom Life was scratching from its book,
And who had not another day to live,
Was me.

- Julian Barnes's novel A History of the World in 10 1/2 Chapters features as chapter 3: "Wars of Religion"—a fictional manuscript reportedly from the Archives Municipales de Besançon.
- Balzac's novel Albert Savaron takes place in Besançon.
- Colonel Sainte-Hermine, the fictional hero of Alexandre Dumas' The Last Cavalier, is a native of Besançon.

The Christmas carol "Berger, Secoue Ton Sommeil Profond", known in English as "Shepherds, Shake Off Your Drowsy Sleep", originated in Besançon in the 17th century.

== Twin towns – sister cities ==
Besançon is twinned with:

- Bielsko-Biała, Poland
- Bistrița, Romania
- Charlottesville, United States
- Douroula, Burkina Faso
- Freiburg im Breisgau, Germany
- Hadera, Israel
- Kirklees, England, United Kingdom
- Kuopio, Finland
- Man, Ivory Coast
- Matsumae, Japan
- Neuchâtel, Switzerland
- Pavia, Italy
- Tver, Russia

== See also ==
- Battle of Besançon
- Centre-Chapelle des Buis
- Communes of the Doubs department
- List of works by James Pradier
- Paintings in Besançon Cathedral
- Protestantism in Besançon
- Immigration to Besançon
- Bregille Funicular
