= Gaffiot =

Gaffiot (French pronunciation: [gafio]) is a French surname, and may refer to:

- Félix Gaffiot (1870–1937), French philologist and teacher
- Dictionnaire Illustré Latin-Français, a 1934 dictionary of Latin, described in French, compiled by Félix Gaffiot, and commonly eponymised for him
