= Yanne Chembo =

Electrical engineer

Yanne Kouomou Chembo
- Born: Cameroon
- Education: University of Yaoundé I University of the Balearic Islands
- Scientific career
- Workplaces: University of Maryland, College Park; FEMTO-ST Institute, French National Centre for Scientific Research; Jet Propulsion Laboratory

Yanne Kouomou Chembo is an electrical engineer and associate professor at the University of Maryland, College Park. His research considers ultra-pure microwaves and Kerr frequency combs. He is a Fellow of The Optical Society and SPIE.

== Early life and education ==
Chembo was born in Cameroon. He attended the University of Yaoundé I where he earned two bachelor's degrees, one in physics and one in telecommunications engineering. Chembo completed two simultaneous doctoral degrees, one at the University of Yaoundé I and one at the University of the Balearic Islands. After earning his doctoral degree, Chembo moved to the French National Centre for Scientific Research (CNRS) FEMTO-ST Institute as a postdoctoral researcher. He joined the Jet Propulsion Laboratory in 2009.

== Research and career ==
Chembo returned to the FEMTO-ST Institute in 2010, where he led a group working on microwave photonics. Here Chembo looked to develop ultra-pure microwaves using optical resonators. He was supported by the European Research Council. He created a photonic module that was capable of generating high-purity microwave signals for aerospace and optical communications. To allow for coherent optical fibre telecommunications, Chembo made use of Kerr frequency combs.

In 2014 Chembo was appointed to the International Commission for Optics committee on regional development.

He stayed in France until 2016, when he moved to the joint Georgia Tech – CNRS Joint International Laboratory. He moved to the University of Maryland, College Park in 2019, where he was made associate professor of Electrical Engineering. He holds a joint position at the Institute for Research in Electronics and Applied Physics (IREAP).

He is an Associate Editor for Optics Express and has helped with the organisation of the International Year of Light.

== Awards and honors ==
- 2019 Fellow of SPIE "for his achievements in ultra-stable microwave photonics oscillators."
- 2020 Fellow of The Optical Society "For pioneering contributions to the development of microwave photonic systems for aerospace and communication engineering, including monolithic optical frequency comb generators and optoelectronic oscillators."
- 2022 Director of the Institute for Research in Electronics and Applied Physics (IREAP) at University of Maryland.
- 2023 Fellow of the American Physical Society "for pioneering contributions to the understanding and application of complexity in time-delayed and spatially extended systems, encompassing experiments and models in both quantum and classical photonic domains"

== Select publications ==
- Chembo, Yanne K.; Menyuk, Curtis R. (2013-05-31). "Spatiotemporal Lugiato-Lefever formalism for Kerr-comb generation in whispering-gallery-mode resonators". Physical Review A. 87 (5) 053852. arXiv:1210.8210. Bibcode:2013PhRvA..87e3852C. doi:10.1103/PhysRevA.87.053852. S2CID 16050188.
- Chembo, Yanne K.; Yu, Nan (2010-09-07). "Modal expansion approach to optical-frequency-comb generation with monolithic whispering-gallery-mode resonators". Physical Review A. 82 (3) 033801. Bibcode:2010PhRvA..82c3801C. doi:10.1103/PhysRevA.82.033801. S2CID 52238985.
- Pasquazi, Alessia; Peccianti, Marco; Razzari, Luca; Moss, David J.; Coen, Stéphane; Erkintalo, Miro; Chembo, Yanne K.; Hansson, Tobias; Wabnitz, Stefan; Del'Haye, Pascal; Xue, Xiaoxiao (2018-01-27). "Micro-combs: A novel generation of optical sources". Physics Reports. 729: 1–81. Bibcode:2018PhR...729....1P. doi:10.1016/j.physrep.2017.08.004. hdl:1959.3/434768. ISSN 0370-1573.
- Chembo, Yanne (2020-01-08). "Machine learning based on reservoir computing with time-delayed optoelectronic and photonic systems". Chaos. 30 (1) 013111. Bibcode:2020Chaos..30a3111C. doi:10.1063/1.5120788. PMID 32013503.
