= Besançon astronomical clock =

Coordinates: 47.2336°N 6.0308°E

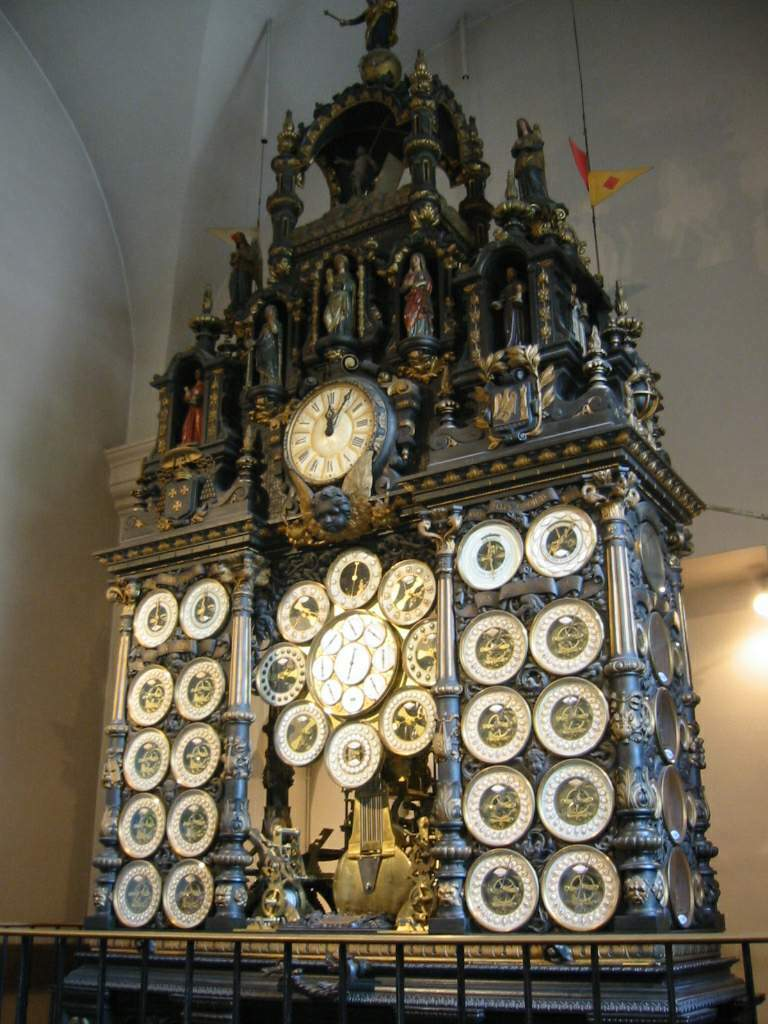
The astronomical clock in Besançon Cathedral

The Besançon astronomical clock is housed in Besançon Cathedral. Auguste-Lucien Vérité of Beauvais designed and built Besançon's present astronomical clock, between 1858 and 1863. It replaced an earlier clock that Bernardin had constructed in the 1850s that proved unsatisfactory. Besançon's clock differs from those in Strasbourg, Lyon, and Beauvais. The clock is meant to express the theological concept that each second of the day the Resurrection of Christ transforms the existence of man and of the world.

== Bernardin's clock ==
A clockmaker called Bernardin made the first astronomical clock installed in Besançon between 1851 and 1857. Bernadin is probably Constant Flavien Bernardin, born 15 January 1819, probably in Fougerolles, who probably came from Fougerolles and lived in Saint-Loup-sur-Semouse. (This Bernardin is not to be confused with Br Bernardin Morin who during the same period constructed the Ploërmel astronomical clock).

Bernardin had exhibited an astronomical clock in 1849 while he was living at Fougerolles The clock he made for Besançon was exhibited in Paris in 1855, where Vérité was also exhibiting and he could certainly have seen it. This clock was described in the 1958 article by René Baillaud.

== Vérité's clock ==
By 1857 Bernardin's clock had stopped working, and Cardinal Mathieu, the Archbishop of Besançon, commissioned a replacement from Vérité, who built it in his workshop in Beauvais. The clock was installed in 1860 but work on it continued until 1863. Immediately after he finished the Besançon commission, Vérité built an even larger, and different, clock, for Beauvais Cathedral.

Bernardin's clock may well provided a point of departure for Vérité when designing his, but apart from general inspiration no specific element seems to have been copied from the earlier one.

In 1900 the clock stopped working; Florian Goudey completely renovated it.

In 1966, the clock stopped again on the death of Paul Brandibas, who had been its keeper for over thirty years. The Ungerer company of Strasbourg renovated it and restored it to full working order.

== Description ==
The clock stands 5.8 metres high and 2.5 metres wide, and has 30,000 mechanical parts and 11 movements. It sits in its own room in the clocktower. Vérité's coat of arms, those of Cardinal Mathieu, and of the cathedral appear on the front of the clock.

- Seventy dials provide 122 indications. These include the seconds, hours, days and years. The clock is a perpetual one that can register up to 10,000 years, including adjustments for leap year cycles. The clock also indicates the times of sunrise and sunset.
- Twenty-one automated figures either ring the quarter-hour and the hour, or perform the Resurrection of Christ at noon, and his burial at 3 pm.
- The clock also has animated pictures of seven different French harbours; dials indicate the hours and height of the tides there. One of the harbours is Saint-Pierre, Martinique; another is Cayenne, French Guiana. There is an eighth animated picture, this one of Saint Helena, where the former emperor Napoleon died in exile.
- An orrery (planetarium) is part of the clock and it shows the motions and orbits of the planets. The planetary motions are congruent with those of the actual planets so that the planetarium reproduces eclipses as they occur.
- The central part of the main body of the clock has 12 dials for parts of the civil calendar, and five for the liturgical calendars. The dials showing the civil calendar show the month, date, day, the solar element that gave its name to the day of the week (e.g., the sun for Sunday), the season, the sign of the Zodiac, the length of the day, the length of the night, the seconds, and the times for sunrise and sunset. One dial gives the date of Easter, and this acts as the driver for dials that present the date for five key days of the Roman Catholic liturgical calendar.
- Two columns have 10 dials each. The bottom eight dials show the time in different major cities around the world, including New York and San Francisco, though without adjustment for daylight saving time, which did not exist at the time the clock was built. The two top dials on the left column show the number of solar and lunar eclipses in the current year. The two dials on the right column show the leap years and leap centuries. The hand on the leap century dial moved for the first time in 2000; it will move for the second time in 2400.
- A pyramidal arrangement of figures caps the clock. The 12 apostles form the base; two different apostles come out each hour to strike the hour. Also, every hour the three virtues, Faith, Hope, and Charity, move, with Faith showing the chalice to Charity and Hope, which stand to her right and left. Above them the statues of the archangels Michael and Gabriel strike the quarter-hours.
- At the top of the clock, at midday, Christ arises from his tomb, and at the 3 pm he returns to it. When he arises, Mary, his mother and Queen of the world, raises her sceptre; she lowers it when he returns to his tomb.
- Through a system of universal joints extending some 100 metres, the clock drives four dials that sit on the four sides of the cathedral's tower, thus providing the time of day to the city. A fifth dial is inside the cathedral. The outside dials also show, respectively, the season, the day of the week, and the month of the year. Cables from the clock activate bells in the tower that sound the quarter hour and the hour.
- Eleven different descending weights drive the clock. Three of the weights need to be reset each day.

== Open ==
- 1 April to 30 September: Open every day except Tuesday
- 1 October to 31 March: Everyday except Tuesday and Wednesday
- Closed: January, 1 May, 1 & 11 November, and 25 December
- Guided tours (when open): 9:50 am, 10:50 am, 2:50 pm, 3:50 pm, and 4:50 pm

== References and external links ==
- Bernardin's clock:
  - Rapport du jury central sur les produits de l'agriculture et de l'industrie exposés en 1849, 1850, page 502 (on the clock exhibited in 1849)
  - René Baillaud: "Histoire de l'horloge astronomique de la Cathédrale Saint-Jean de Besançon", Académie des sciences, belles-lettres et arts de Besançon, procès-verbaux et mémoires, volume 172, 1958, pages 350-367
  - Henri Edouard Tresca, Ch. Lahure: Visite à l'exposition universelle de Paris, en 1855, 1855 page 398
  - Le Canada et l'Exposition universelle de 1855, 1856, pages 271 and 326
  - Le Quérard: Archives d'histoire littéraire, de biographie et de bibliographie françaises, volume 1, 1855, page 401
  - L'Ami des sciences, 1855, volume 1, page 456
- Vérité's clock:
  - Notice descriptive de l'horloge astronomique de l'église cathédrale de Besançon, Besançon, 1861, 36 pages
  - Cosmos, 1862, pages 457, 486, 525
  - R. Goudey: Horloge astronomique de Saint-Jean de Besançon, 1909, 30 pages
  - Alfred Ungerer: Les horloges astronomiques et monumentales les plus remarquables de l'antiquité jusqu'à nos jours, Strasbourg, 1931, pages 62–64 (doesn't mention Bernardin's clock)
  - P. Brandibas-Goudey: L'Horloge astronomique de Saint-Jean Besançon, 1937, 31 pages
  - M. Hanke: Astronomical Clock of Besancon, thePuristS
  - Official website: Horloge de Besançon (Monuments nationaux)
