= St. Stephen's Cathedral, Besançon =

St. Stephen's Cathedral
- French: Cathédrale Saint-Étienne de Besançon
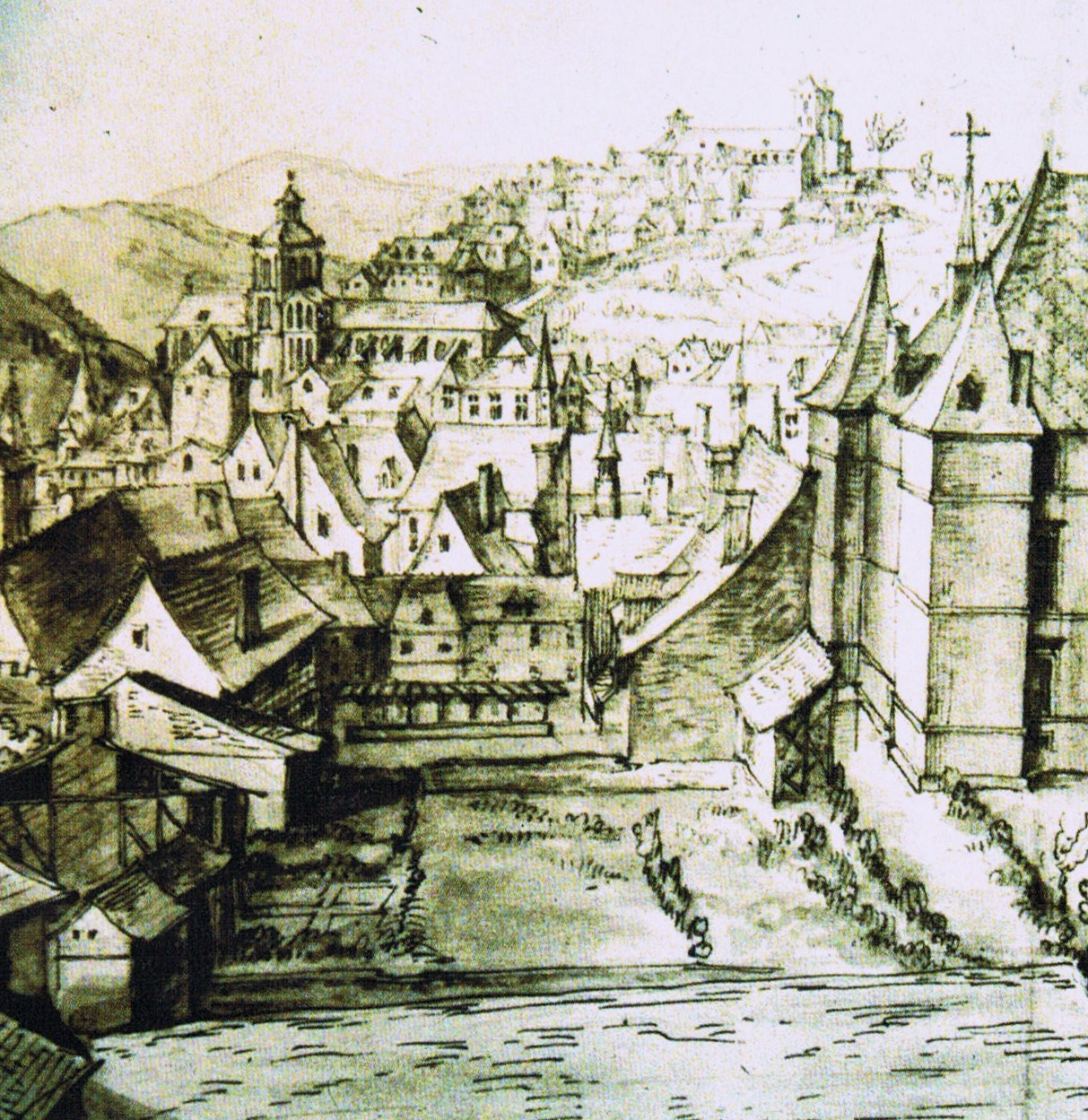
- St. Stephen's Cathedral
- 47°13′53″N 6°01′57″E
- Location: Besançon, Franche-Comté, eastern France
- Denomination: Catholic

Architecture
- Architectural type: church
- Style: Romanesque
- Years built: Between 326 AD and the fifth century
- Closed: 1668

St. Stephen's Cathedral (French: Cathédrale Saint-Étienne de Besançon) was a Roman Catholic church located in Besançon on the site of the current Citadel of Besançon in Franche-Comté, eastern France.

The cathedral was thought to be constructed between 326 AD and the fifth century. Between the 12th and 13th centuries there was continuing friction between St. Stephen's Cathedral and St. John's Cathedral (French: Cathédrale Saint-Jean, the present Besançon Cathedral),which was believed to be a more recent foundation. Hugues de Salins, who redesigned St. John's, also led the reconstruction plans for St. Stephen's between 1033 and 1050. The two were intended to coexist, despite St. John's having more power in the elections of archbishops.

In 1092 St. Stephen's complained that it had been stripped of its precedence, despite the archdiocese believing that it was the principal one of Besançon. In 1238 it was excommunicated due to its attacks against St. John's. Between 1253 and 1254, Archbishop Guillaume de la Tour unified the two chapters, a decision which was ratified by Pope Innocent IV on 1 August 1254.

After the Battle of Besançon in 1575, masses were held at both cathedrals to celebrate the Catholic victory against the Protestants.

From 1668 to 1675, St. Stephen's Cathedral was abandoned and it was later decided that it should be destroyed, along with some surrounding houses, to allow for the construction of the Citadel of Besançon, after Franche-Comté was given to Louis XIV in the Treaties of Nijmegen. However, it was then decided that the cathedral should remain, but it was stripped of its contents, and then destroyed in any case after an accidental fire, when construction of the citadel began. The present Besançon Cathedral currently contains 8 paintings that were copied from 15th-century frescos in the destroyed cathedral, and an eight-lobed marble altar now known as the Rose of Saint John.

== See also ==
- Paintings in the Besançon Cathedral
