= Marie and Louis Pasteur University =

French public university based in Besançon

Coordinates: 47°14′26″N 6°01′21″E

- Université Marie-et-Louis-Pasteur
- Type: Public university
- Established: 1423 (in Dole, Jura); 1621 (in Besançon)
- Rector: Hugues Daussy
- Faculty: 1,200 (1,500 professional tutors)
- Administrative staff: 850
- Students: 28.994 (2020)
- Location: Besançon, France
- Mascot: Lynx
- Website: umlp.fr

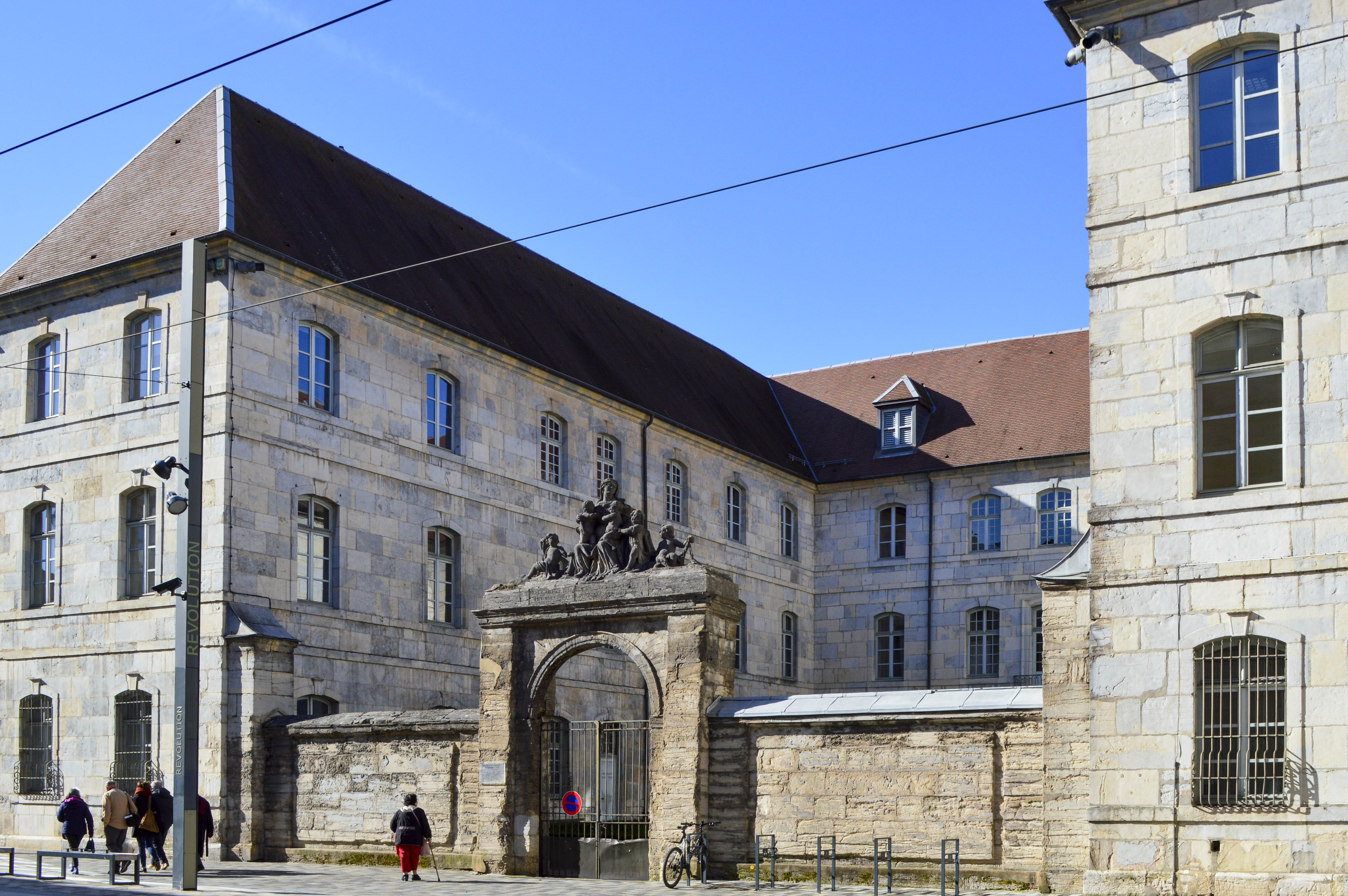
University headquarters in downtown Besançon

The Marie and Louis Pasteur University (French: Université Marie et Louis Pasteur, UMLP), formerly known as University of Franche-Comté, is a pluridisciplinary public French university located in Besançon, Franche-Comté, with decentralized campuses in Belfort, Montbéliard, Vesoul and Lons-le-Saunier.

With 28 research labs, 667 PhD students and 788 research professors in 2016–2017, the Marie and Louis Pasteur University is well represented in the research community. It collaborates with many organizations (University Hospital of Besançon, CNRS, INSERM, CEA, etc.).

It has about 29,000 students, including nearly a third of scholarship students and 12% of foreign students. Its Centre for Applied Linguistics (CLA) is one of the world's leading schools for teaching French as a foreign language and French linguistics.

== History ==
The university was founded in 1423 in Dole, at that time in the Duchy of Burgundy. It was moved to Besançon in 1691 as Dole was being punished for having resisted too long against the king of France Louis XIV during his conquest of the region.

The university was renamed Université Marie et Louis Pasteur in 2025, in honor of the scientist Louis Pasteur, originally from Franche-Comté, and his wife, Marie Pasteur, who actively assisted him in his research.

== Institutes & Schools ==
IUT Nord Franche-Comté. The Institute of Technology (IUT) located in the northern part of Franche-Comté offers a range of engineering and technical programs.

IUT Besançon-Vesoul. This Institute of Technology provides technical education in various fields, including engineering, IT, and industrial sciences.

ISIFC – Institut Supérieur d'Ingénieurs de Franche-Comté. The ISIFC offers advanced engineering programs, specializing in various disciplines of engineering and technology.

IAE – Institut d'Administration des Entreprises. The IAE offers programs in business administration, management, and related fields, providing a comprehensive education for future leaders.

IPAG – Institut de Préparation à l'Administration Générale. Focused on preparing students for public administration careers, the IPAG provides specialized training and courses in government-related fields.

INSPE – Institut National Supérieur du Professorat et de l'Éducation. The INSPE offers programs for teacher training and professional development in education.

CLA – Centre de Linguistique Appliquée. The Centre for Applied Linguistics (CLA) at the Marie and Louis Pasteur University is one of the top institutions for language teaching. It has research collaborations in over 110 countries and works closely with the French Ministry of Education and the Ministry of Foreign Affairs. The CLA is recognized internationally for its expertise in linguistics and language teaching.

SUP FC – Service Universitaire de Pédagogie pour les Formations et la Certification. SUP FC offers pedagogical services and support for academic programs and certification. It focuses on enhancing educational methods and ensuring high-quality teaching standards across disciplines.

Centre of Distance Teaching (CTU). The Centre of Distance Teaching provides opportunities for individuals working in various fields to continue their education in areas such as history, IT, mathematics, and management (AEG). It allows for flexible learning, catering to the needs of professionals seeking further education while maintaining their careers.

== Research centres ==
The Marie and Louis Pasteur University hosts a diverse and interdisciplinary research environment, with 19 research units, including 12 university-based units and 7 mixed units in collaboration with major public research organizations like CNRS, INSERM, and CEA. Additionally, there are 5 federative structures.Université Marie & Louis Pasteur

Research at UFC spans a wide range of fields, from engineering and fundamental sciences to humanities and social sciences.

Fundamental Sciences and Engineering Sciences

- FEMTO-ST Institute – Franche-Comté Electronics, Mechanics, Thermodynamics, and Optics - Sciences and Technologies. It is one of France's largest laboratories in its field.
- UTINAM Institute – Universe, Transport, Interfaces, Nanostructures, Atmosphere and Environment, Molecules. Focuses on theoretical physics, astrophysics, molecular physics, and chemistry.
- LMB (Laboratory of Mathematics of Besançon). Researches mathematical sciences, particularly applied mathematics.

Natural Sciences, Environment, and Territory

- Chrono-environment Laboratory. Specializes in climate change, environmental dynamics, and geospatial sciences.
- ThéMA Laboratory. Focuses on territorial development and geographical modeling for sustainable urban planning and development.

Legal, Economic, and Management Sciences

- CRJFC – Research Center for Legal Studies. Conducts research in various legal disciplines and public law.
- CRESE – Research Center on Economic Strategies. Investigates economic strategies, economic modeling, and sustainable development.
- CREGO – Research Center in Organizational Management. Focuses on organizational management, including strategies for managing organizations and public administration.

Humanities and Social Sciences

- CRIT – Centre for Interdisciplinary and Transcultural Research. A center for interdisciplinary research in humanities, including literature, history, and cultural studies.
- ELLIADD – Publishing, Languages, Literatures, Computer Science, Arts, Didactics, Discourse. Explores the intersection of language, literature, arts, and digital technologies.
- Logics of Action. A philosophy lab specializing in human action, decision-making, and ethics.
- LASA – Laboratory of Sociology and Anthropology. Researches sociology and anthropology, with a focus on societal structures and cultural change.
- Lucien Febvre Center. Dedicated to historical research, especially social history, cultural history, and historical methodologies.
- ISTA – Institute of Sciences and Techniques of Antiquity. Specializes in ancient civilizations, focusing on archaeology, history, and the cultural heritage of antiquity.
- Psychology Laboratory. Focuses on psychological research, including clinical psychology and neuropsychology.

Health and Sports Sciences

- C3S Laboratory. Investigates the relationship between culture, sports, health, and society.
- Sinergies. Researches integrated health, nanomedicine, artificial intelligence, and engineering for health, with an emphasis on personalized medicine.
- Host-Graft-Tumor Interactions and Cellular and Tissue Engineering. Specializes in cancer research, tissue engineering, and stem cell biology, focusing on cancer treatments and regenerative medicine.
- LINC – Laboratory of Integrative and Clinical Neurosciences. Focuses on clinical neuroscience, including brain functions, neurodegenerative diseases, and psychology.

Federative Structures

- Burgundy-Franche-Comté Mathematics Federation. A federation supporting mathematical research in the region, with collaborations across institutions.
- FR-EDUC – Research Federation in Education. Conducts research on educational methods, pedagogy, and educational policy.
- FCLAB – Fuel Cell LAB. Specializes in fuel cell technologies and energy systems, focusing on renewable energy solutions.
- MSHE – House of Human and Environmental Sciences Claude Nicolas Ledoux. A research platform for human sciences and environmental studies, with an emphasis on interdisciplinary research.
- OSU THETA. An observatory for astronomy, earth sciences, and environmental studies, with a focus on space-time phenomena and climate dynamics.

== Research visibility ==
Much of the international visibility in pure and applied science at the Marie and Louis Pasteur University comes through the CNRS FEMTO-ST.

== Research about Wikipedia ==
In 2015, Dr José Lages of the Marie and Louis Pasteur University and Dima Shepelyansky of Paul Sabatier University in Toulouse published a global university ranking based on Wikipedia scholarly citations.

== Notable scholars and alumni ==
=== Notable professors ===
- Louis Bachelier, mathematician, founder of financial mathematics.
- Robert Badinter, activist and criminal lawyer.
- Georges Duby, mediaeval historian.
- Olivier Duhamel, politician.
- Felix Gaffiot, author of Dictionnaire Illustré Latin-Français.
- Corine Pelluchon, philosopher.
- Louis Rougier, philosopher.
- Henri Étienne Sainte-Claire Deville, chemist known for his work with aluminium.

=== Alumni ===
- Yukiya Amano, Japanese diplomat, and former director general of the International Atomic Energy Agency (IAEA) (July 2009 – 2019).
- Jean-Luc Lagarce, actor and director.
- Claude Lorius, glaciologist.
- Yves Jégo, politician.
- Dr. Paolo Macchiarini, Swiss thoracic surgeon and former regenerative medicine researcher. Obtained degree certificates—a masters in organ and tissue transplantation dated 1994 and a doctorate in the same dated 1997.
- Jean-Luc Mélenchon, prominent French politician.
- Abdellatif Miraoui, Moroccan Minister of Higher Education, Scientific Research and Innovation.
- Hubert-Félix Thiéfaine, pop-rock singer.
- Abdoulaye Wade, President of Senegal (2000–2012)
- Viviane Wade, French-born First Lady of Senegal (2000–2012)

== Points of interest ==
- Centre for Applied Linguistics
- Jardin botanique de Besançon

== See also ==
- List of early modern universities in Europe
- List of public universities in France by academy
