= Jardin botanique de Besançon =

Botanical garden in Doubs, Franche-Comté, France

Coordinates: 47.2433°N 6.0145°E

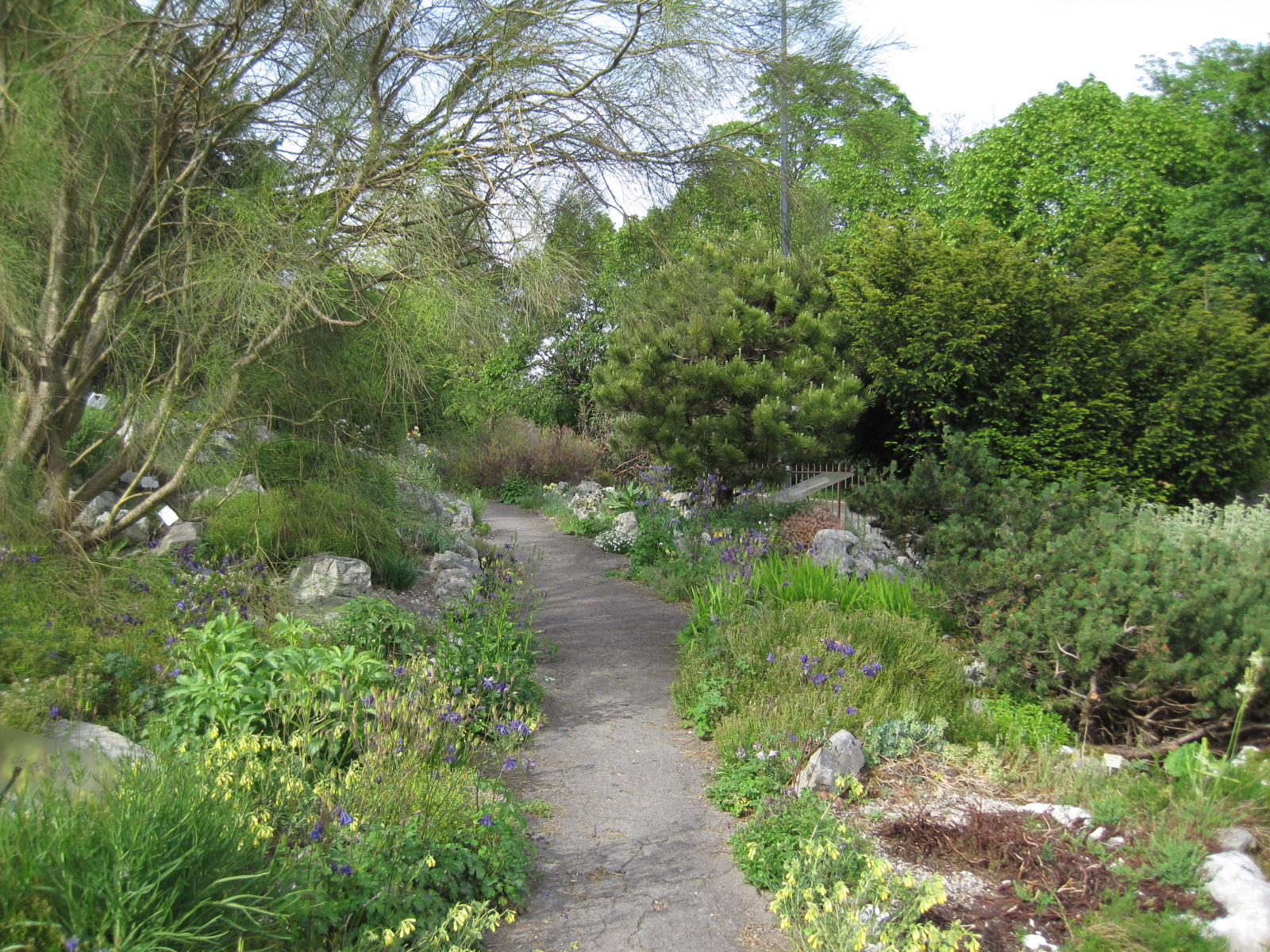
The garden.

The Jardin botanique de Besançon (Botanical Garden of Besançon), more formally the Jardin botanique de l'Université de Franche-Comté et de la Ville de Besançon, is a botanical garden located on the Place du Maréchal Leclerc, Besançon, Doubs, Franche-Comté, France. It is operated by the University of Franche-Comté and open daily; admission is free.

Besançon's first botanical garden was established in 1580, but since then the garden has moved across more than 10 sites in the city, assuming its current location in 1957. In 1988 it was reorganized from a traditional systematic collection to a style more oriented to the general public.

Today the garden contains more than 5,000 species set within environments representing the Franche-Comté region, including its bogs, cliffs, wetlands, and the limestone ridge of the Jura Plateau, as well as various other parts of the world. Principal collections include carnivorous plants, succulents, medicinal plants, orchids, roses, and various types of trees and fruit trees.

== See also ==
- List of botanical gardens in France
