= Besançon Cathedral =

Roman Catholic church in Besançon, France

Coordinates: 47°14′1″N 6°1′50″E

Besançon Cathedral Cathédrale Saint-Jean de Besançon
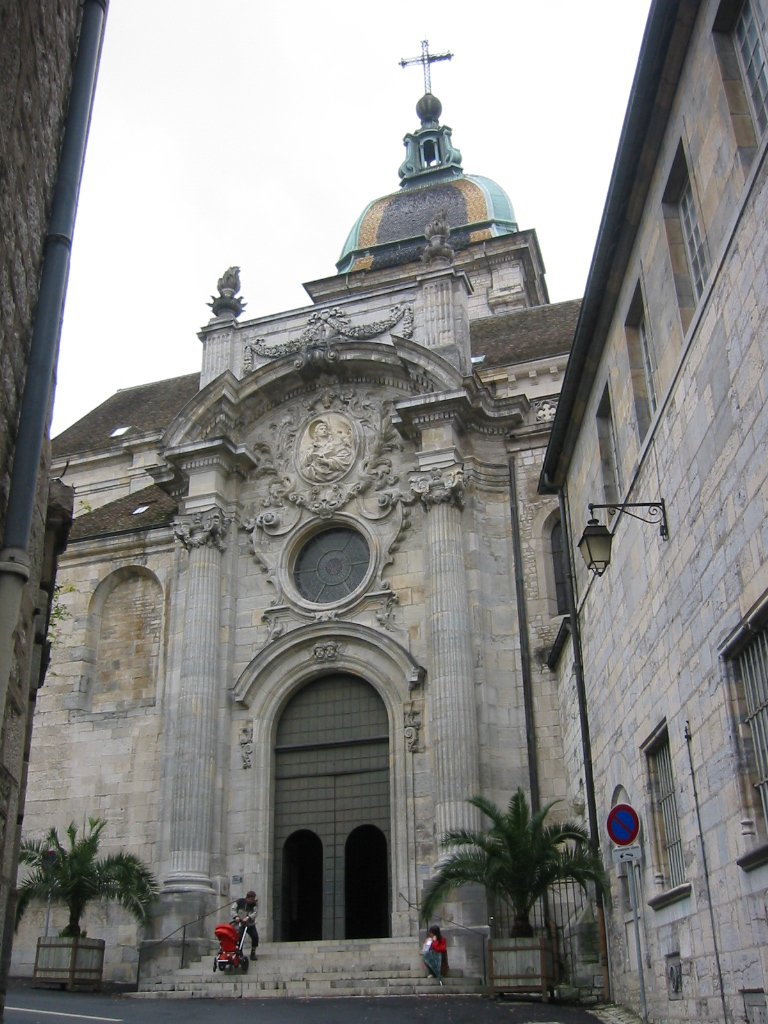
- Besançon Cathedral

Religion
- Affiliation: Roman Catholic Church
- Province: Archbishop of Besançon
- Region: Doubs
- Rite: Roman Rite
- Ecclesiastical or organisational status: Cathedral
- Status: Active

Location
- Location: Besançon, France
- Interactive map of Besançon Cathedral; Cathédrale Saint-Jean de Besançon

Architecture
- Type: church
- Style: Romanesque
- Groundbreaking: 11th century
- Completed: 19th century

Besançon Cathedral (French: Cathédrale Saint-Jean de Besançon) is a Roman Catholic church dedicated to Saint John located in the city of Besançon, France. It is the seat of the Archbishop of Besançon.

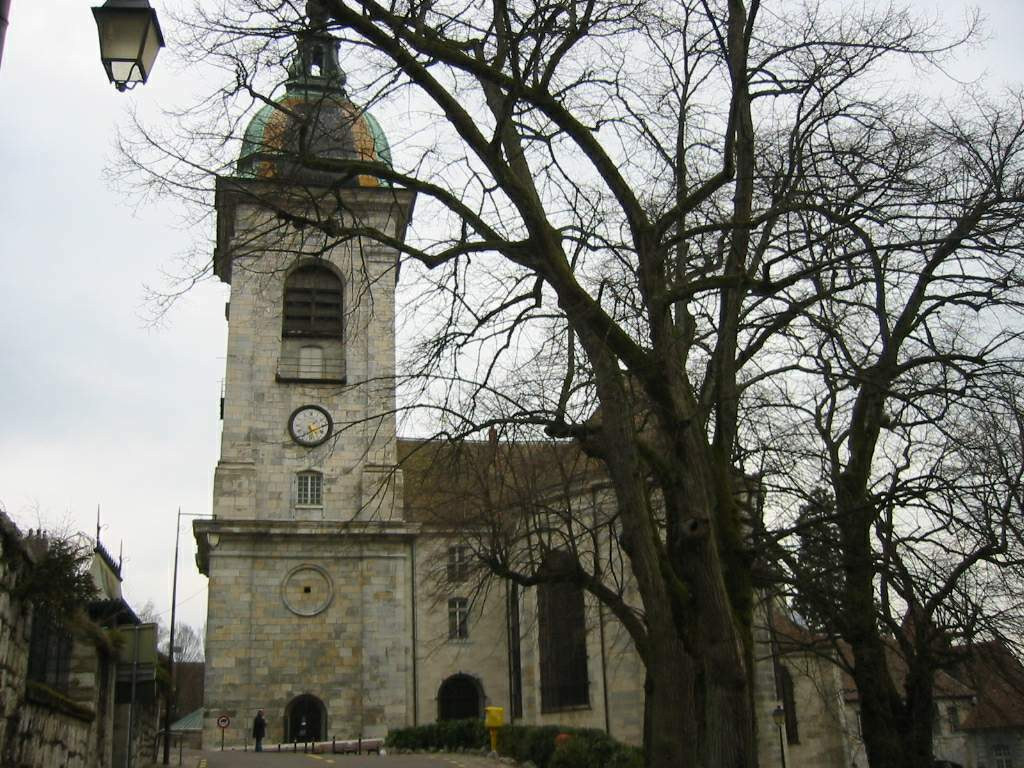
Besançon Cathedral

The cathedral consists of a large nave between two aisles, and dates from the 11th to the 13th century. It has two facing apses, each with an altar. The lack of a transept and the facing apses parallel the designs of contemporary German cathedrals. The Romanesque arches date from the 13th century. It does not have a main doorway. The choir dates to the 18th century.

The cathedral is situated near the base of Mont Saint-Étienne, below the citadel. To the east of the cathedral is the 16th-century Porte Rivotte, with two round towers, and pedestrian walkways dating to the 19th century. To the west is the Porte Noire, a Roman triumphal arch of the 2nd century with extensive sculptural decoration.

== History ==
Between 1127 and 1161 the cathedral was rebuilt on the foundation of a basilica dating to the 9th century. However, in 1212, a fire destroyed its timber frame.

In 1525 Erasmus of Rotterdam visited Besançon at the invitation of Ferry Carondelet. Local notables tried to entice him to stay, offering him an allowance and a house, but Erasmus declined the offer.

On 16 June 1683, King Louis XIV visited Besançon. He stayed at the Palais Granvelle, together with the Queen and the Dauphin, and visited the cathedral.

In 1724 the bell tower collapsed. The apse of the Holy Shroud was built in its place in 1730.

In the 1850s the cathedral received an astronomical clock that proved unsatisfactory. It was replaced by the present clock in 1860.

In 1875 the cathedral was declared an historic monument.

== Features ==
To the left of the entrance is the tomb of Ferry Carondelet (1473-1528), a canon of Saint John and abbot of the abbey of Saint Columbanus in Montbenoît. The grave was made in Flanders c. 1543 and the sculpture reflects influences from the Italian Renaissance.

The eastern apse was rebuilt in 1730 on the site of the collapsed bell tower. It was decorated in the Louis XV style, using stucco, marble, and gilded wood. The altar contained a copy of the Shroud of Turin; Besançon's shroud disappeared during the French Revolution. The apse contains paintings representing the passion and resurrection of Christ by Charles-Joseph Natoire, Jean François de Troy, and Charles-André van Loo. The floor of the apse is of marble and represents Jerusalem, together with the eight gates and four palaces mentioned respectively in the Old and New Testaments. The paintings by de Troy are The Martyrdom of Saint Stephen, Christ in the Garden of Olives, and Christ carrying the Cross. The paintings by Natoire are The removal of Christ's body from the cross and The placement of Christ's body in the tomb. The van Loo painting is The resurrection of Christ.

The clock tower contains a notable astronomical clock with thousands of moving parts and several animated functions.

There are several chapels off the nave on the north side.

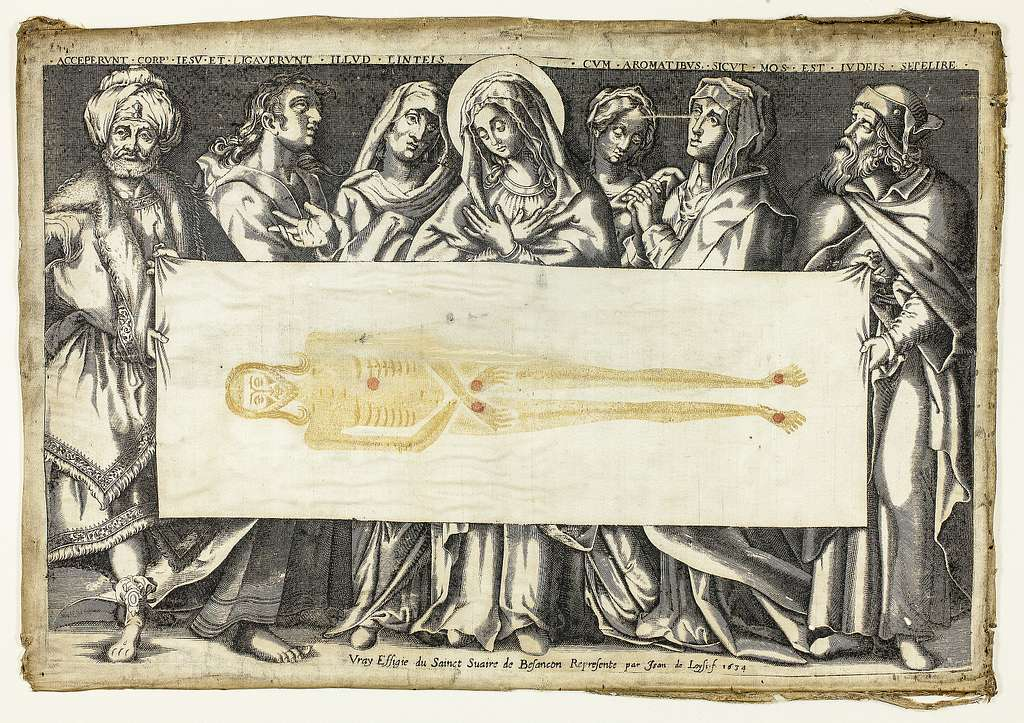
The Holy Shroud of Besancon, it was documented as being older than the Shroud of Turin, from around 1206.

The first chapel was rebuilt in 1328 by John of Cicon in honor of St. Peter. In 1914, the chapel was dedicated to Saint Joseph. It holds a marble, eight-lobed, circular altar table known as the Rose of Saint John; it is a little over one meter in diameter. Pope Leon IX consecrated the altar in 1050, at which time it stood in St. Stephen's Cathedral, Besançon, which used to stand where part of the fortifications of the Citadel of Besançon now stand. In 1711 it was placed on the cathedral's great altar. Then in 1790 it was built into the wall of the apse. On 6 January 1898 it was moved to the baptistry chapel.

The Eucharist Chapel contains the painting of Our Lady of the Jacobins, that Domenico Passignano (Domenico Cresti) painted in 1630.

The next chapel dates to the second half of the 13th century, but received Gothic embellishments in the 17th century. It contains an unfinished alabaster Pietà, the Virgin of Pity, by Conrad Meit. He produced it in 1532 at the request of Margaret of Austria's chaplain, the Abbot Antoine de Montécut. The abbey of Saint Vincent de Besançon received it from the abbot and originally displayed it in a small chapel dedicated to Our Lady of Sorrows.

The pulpit dates to 1459.

The western apse has two levels. The first level has seven Romanesque windows. The second has seven Gothic bays.

Lastly, near the organ, there is the painting Madonna in Glory with Saints, which Fra Bartolomeo painted in Florence in 1512 as an altarpiece for the cathedral.

== Burials ==
- Antoine Perrenot de Granvelle
- Charles Binet
- Louis William Valentine Dubourg
- Nicholas Perrenot de Granvelle (1484—1550)
- William I, Count of Burgundy

== In fiction ==
Chapter 28, "A Procession," in Stendhal's novel Le Rouge et le Noir (The Red and the Black, 1830) takes place in Besançon Cathedral and includes a description of the cathedral decorations for the Feast of Corpus Christi.

== See also ==
- Paintings in the Besançon Cathedral
- St. Stephen's Cathedral, Besançon

== Citations and references ==
Citations

References

- The Seven Marvels of Saint John's Cathedral
