= René Baillaud =

French astronomer

René Baillaud (10 November 1885 – 2 July 1977) was a French astronomer born in Toulouse. He is noted for inventing a paraboloid device used to detect incoming aircraft sounds before the introduction of radar. This parabolic device reflected the sound of the aircraft towards the observers' ears.

== Biography ==
Baillaud initially worked at the observatories of Nice from 1910 to 1924 and of Marseille from 1924 to 1930. He was also teaching at the "École d'Ingénieurs de Marseille", before taking a chair as professor at the University of Besançon and becoming director of the Besançon observatory until 1957. During this time he oversees the installation of special clock, in a specially built room 5 meter underneath the observatories' library to maintain constant temperature, allowing the observatory to join the establishment of a global time network.

Baillaud was one of the scientists recruited by General Gustave-Auguste Ferrié to build France's acoustic defense during the First World War. The group included the celebrated physicist Jean Perrin, a future Nobel laureate.

== Works ==
=== Paraboloid ===
This instrument made it possible to establish the position of planes without having to see them, using only the sound they produced. The first prototype was made of wood and measured 60 cm in diameter. The precision of the instrument was such, that it was used during the First World War by the French military to repel night attacks from German bombers by pointing searchlights at them. This furthermore represented a rare technological superiority for the French. After this remarkable start in the fields of acoustics, he nonetheless decided to abandon this field. The reason being that his professor's own instrument didn't get chosen by the French military, and René feared he would have no academic future in this field. He then turned chronometry.

He is a founding member of the French society of chronometry, and its first chief of staff, creating in 1931 the journal "Annales Françaises de Chronométrie". In order to join the global mapping project "Carte du Ciel" (directed by his brother), he oversees the installation of a specific instrument: "astrographe triple" dedicated to this purpose. He published his autobiography Souvenirs d'un jeune Toulousain (1885) and Souvenirs: parents et amis de Toulouse et de l'Aveyron, d'un siecle a l'autre (1976). The first publication served as an account of the development of the French acoustic defense.

René Baillaud is one of the eight children of Benjamin Baillaud, and the brother of Jules Baillaud and Émile Baillaud.

== Bibliography ==
- René Baillaud, Baillaud, famille d'astronomes, Besançon, rédaction à la demande de la Sächsische Akademie der Wissenschaften zu Leipzig (J.C. Poggendorff bibliographisch-litterarisches Handwörterbuch, Band VII b), 1967
- Unité de temps, William Markowitz, Paul Libessart, René Baillaud Observatoire national de Besançon, 1955
- Annales Françaises De Chronométrie. 1948–1949 Baillaud (René); Haag (Jules)
- Détermination de l'heure au moyen de l'instrument photographique des hauteurs égales, par René Baillaud. Presses universitaires de France, 1923
