= Centre for Applied Linguistics =

School in Besançon, France

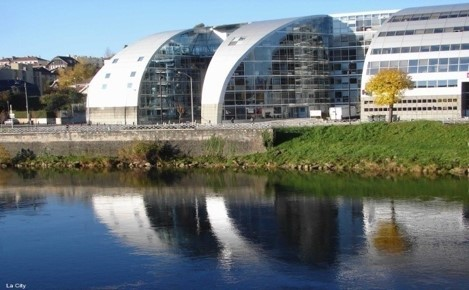

The Centre for Applied Linguistics (CLA), Besançon (French: Centre de linguistique appliquée de Besançon) is one of France’s leading institutions for teaching French as a foreign language and French linguistics. It holds the French government's Qualité Français Langue Étrangère label, awarded to centers offering high-quality French language instruction.

== History ==
Founded in 1958, and part of the University of Franche-Comté, the CLA is located in the City Building at 6, rue Gabriel Plançon, in Besançon.

== Courses and research ==
Each year, the CLA hosts over 4,000 students from around the world. It is primarily known for its teaching of French as a foreign language and French linguistics. Its courses range from two weeks to year-long. The CLA also offers tailored courses to teachers of French as a foreign language which incorporate theories of both applied linguistics and pedagogy.

In addition to teaching French as a foreign language and French linguistics, the CLA offers nine other languages on a permanent basis (Arabic, Chinese, English, German, Italian, Japanese, Portuguese, Russian and Spanish) and other languages on request.

The CLA has a large network of partners worldwide (including UNESCO, the World Bank, the International Monetary Fund and international universities) to whom it offers courses and assistance, and with whom it collaborates in applied linguistics research.

== Facilities ==
The CLA has over 100 permanent staff and facilities that include:

- 32 classrooms
- a resource centre and autonomous study workshops
- a multi-purpose hall
- 3 multimedia laboratories
- a café
- an accommodation service for students

The CLA also organises a large number of cultural and leisure activities for students to assist their understanding of French culture and to facilitate their stay in France.

== See also ==
- Besançon
- University of Franche-Comté
