= Paintings in Besançon Cathedral =

35 works in Besançon Cathedral, France

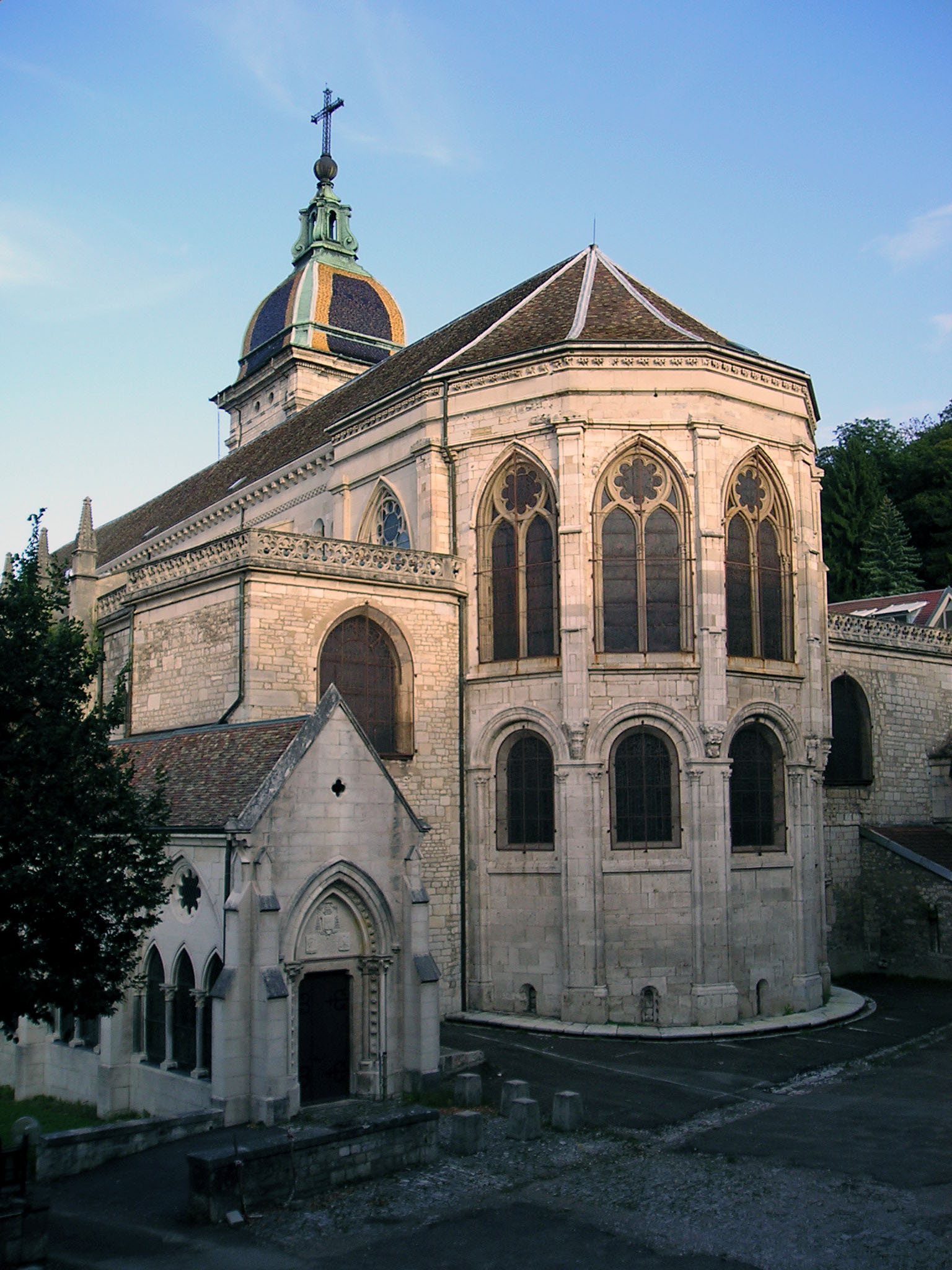
Besançon Cathedral

The paintings in Besançon Cathedral comprise a total of 35 canvases listed as historical monuments, including masterpieces by artists such as Fra Bartolomeo, Jean-François de Troy, Charles-Joseph Natoire, and Charles André van Loo. Most works were executed during the 17th century, although some were produced in the 18th and 19th centuries. The largest canvases hang in the apse of the Holy Shroud and the chapel of the Sacred Heart, but other works are also stored in rooms not open to visitors, making them impossible to contemplate. Today, after the Musée des Beaux-Arts et d'Archéologie, the Cathédrale Saint-Jean in Besançon is the building with the largest number of paintings, far ahead of the Eglise Sainte-Madeleine and the city's observatory.

== History of painting in the cathedral ==
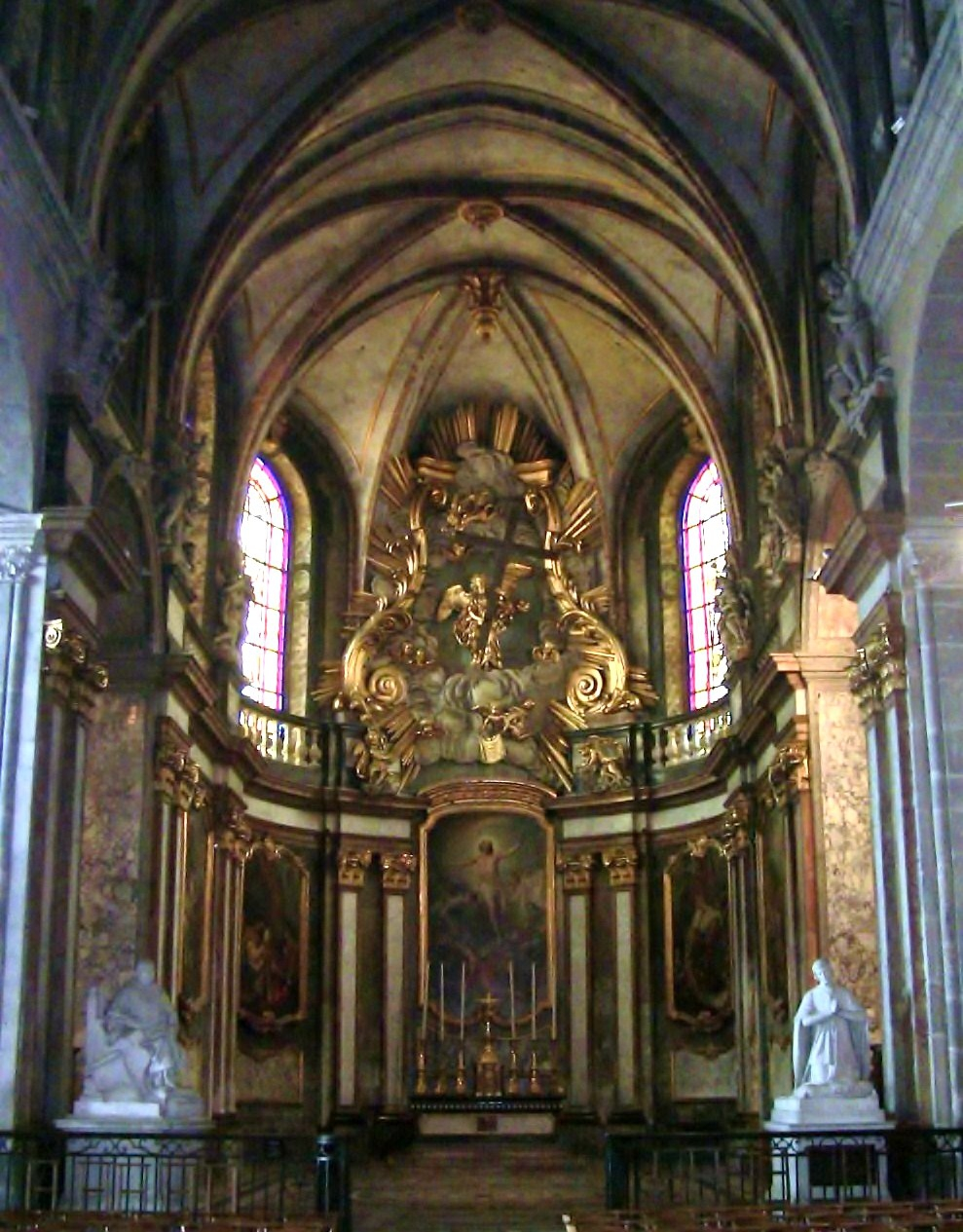
The apse of the Holy Shroud, where the most beautiful paintings hang.

=== Reconstruction of the east choir ===
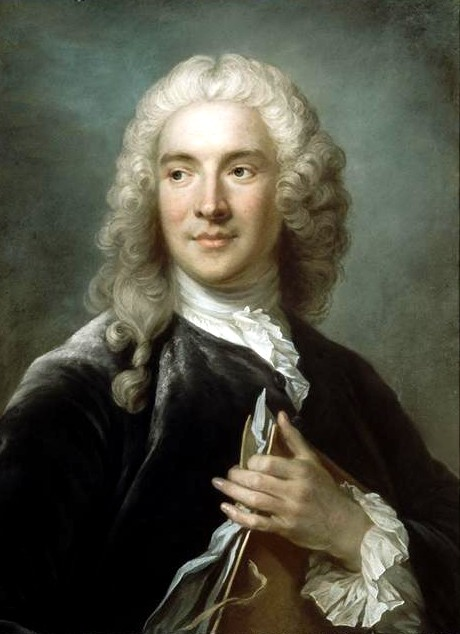
Charles-Joseph Natoire.

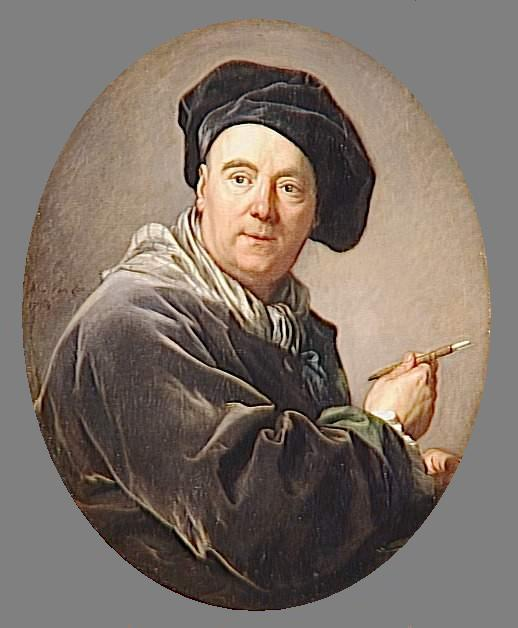
Charles André van Loo, 1764.

When the bell tower collapsed in 1729, Abbé Humbert defined the new iconography for the apse, known as the "Holy Shroud", on January 17, 1748. It depicts five episodes from the last moments of Jesus' life, thus enhancing the Holy Shroud's value. In their quest for excellence and prestige, the canons turned to one of the finest French painters of the time, the artist Charles André van Loo. Canon Courchetet reported on March 17, 1749, that he was in communication with the artist, who asked for the princely sum of 12,500 livres for all five canvases, or 2,500 livres each. However, the diocese did not have sufficient financial resources to pay for Van Loo's services and decided to commission a single canvas from the painter. Thus, on June 27, 1749, Charles André van Loo agreed with Father Mignot to paint the Resurrection for the sum of 2,250 livres, with the chapter particularly insisting on the inclusion of the Holy Shroud in his canvas. Once completed, the painting was placed in the chapter house around 1750, pending completion of the work. In the same year, Canon Arvisenet commissioned the artist Jean-François de Troy to paint the Martyrdom of Saint-Etienne, a work destined to adorn the chapel dedicated to this saint to the north of the apse.

Donations enabled the main cycle to progress, and on January 13, 1751, Abbé Mignot commissioned Charles André van Loo to complete the remaining four works for the sum of 1,600 livres, on the sole condition that his wife be offered a gold cloth reproduction of the Bisontinental Holy Shroud. Although the artist gradually increased his demands, in March 1751 he agreed to execute two paintings for 3,200 livres: La descente de la croix and La Sépulture de Notre-Seigneur. At the same time as the negotiations with Van Loo were taking place, the chapter of Saint-Jean asked the painter Jean-François de Troy to produce two of the first canvases in the cycle, Christ in the Garden of Olives and Christ Carrying the Cross to Calvary (February 28, 1751). The Besançon diocese's choice of this artist is explained by Jean-François de Troy's growing recognition as a religious painter and the speed with which his works were completed. They were completed in December 1751 and shipped from Rome via Marseille in January 1752. Furious, Charles André van Loo refused to paint the two canvases he had agreed to complete, claiming that he did not want his paintings to be hung next to canvases. In truth, Van Loo tried every means possible to get out of his commitment, as he no longer had the will to complete other works during this period. It was then that the clergy of the Comtoise capital called on Charles-Joseph Natoire.

Charles-Joseph Natoire agreed to take on the paintings abandoned by Van Loo, and on April 4, 1753, wrote a letter to the Archbishop of Besançon, committing himself to painting the Saint-Ferréol and Saint-Ferjeux for 1,500 livres. On April 11, 1753, the then archbishop decided to pay for the last two paintings commissioned from Natoire, and on June 13, 1753, Natoire agreed to be paid 1,500 livres per canvas. The Preaching of Saint-Ferréol and Saint-Ferjeux was completed at the end of 1754 and arrived in Besançon in July 1755. The municipal magistrates, delighted with the quality of the painting, decided to pay for the gilded frame and had a note engraved on it, recalling their generosity. In black letters, the canvas reads: "ex dono civitatis". A letter from Natoire to the Marquis de Marigny dated August 27, 1754, states

"I have completed another painting for a chapel in Besançon (the Entombment). My predecessor and Mr. Vanloo having already worked for this cathedral, I could not refuse the eagerness of the canons to engage me as one of their brave confrères. This painting is accompanied by a very advanced Descent from the Cross. I would have wished that these pieces had been plastered in Paris rather than in the provinces".

The canvases were assembled and placed in the new apse in March 1756, and a workman named Flammand installed them and supplied the necessary materials for 330 livres. On March 4, 1756, the altars of the Holy Shroud, Saint-Étienne, and Saints Ferréol and Ferjeux were consecrated by Archbishop Antoine-Clériade de Choiseul-Beaupré.

During one of her trips to Franche-Comté in 1790, a certain Madame Gauthier recounted: "There is (in the cathedral) a modern chapel, lined with varied and polished marble, adorned with five paintings: two by Natoire, very mediocre, and two by Etroy, whose drawing is esteemed, but the coloring is so bad, that they should be preferred to the painter's sketches. What's more, they would be better if they were also overshadowed by an Ascension by Carle Vanloo, placed on the altar. The composition is beautiful: the serenity is a gentle joy spread over the main figure, making it the emblem of beatitude; we could perhaps wish for a little more nobility. In the flight Jesus takes towards heaven, he appears detached from the painting, and this must be great merit".

The works inaccessible to the public come from the former chapter of Saint-Étienne, destroyed in 1674. They were not stored like the other paintings for lack of space but hung in the rooms reserved for the city's clergy.

== Works accessible to the public ==
=== Eastern apse ===
==== Le Christ au jardin des Oliviers ====
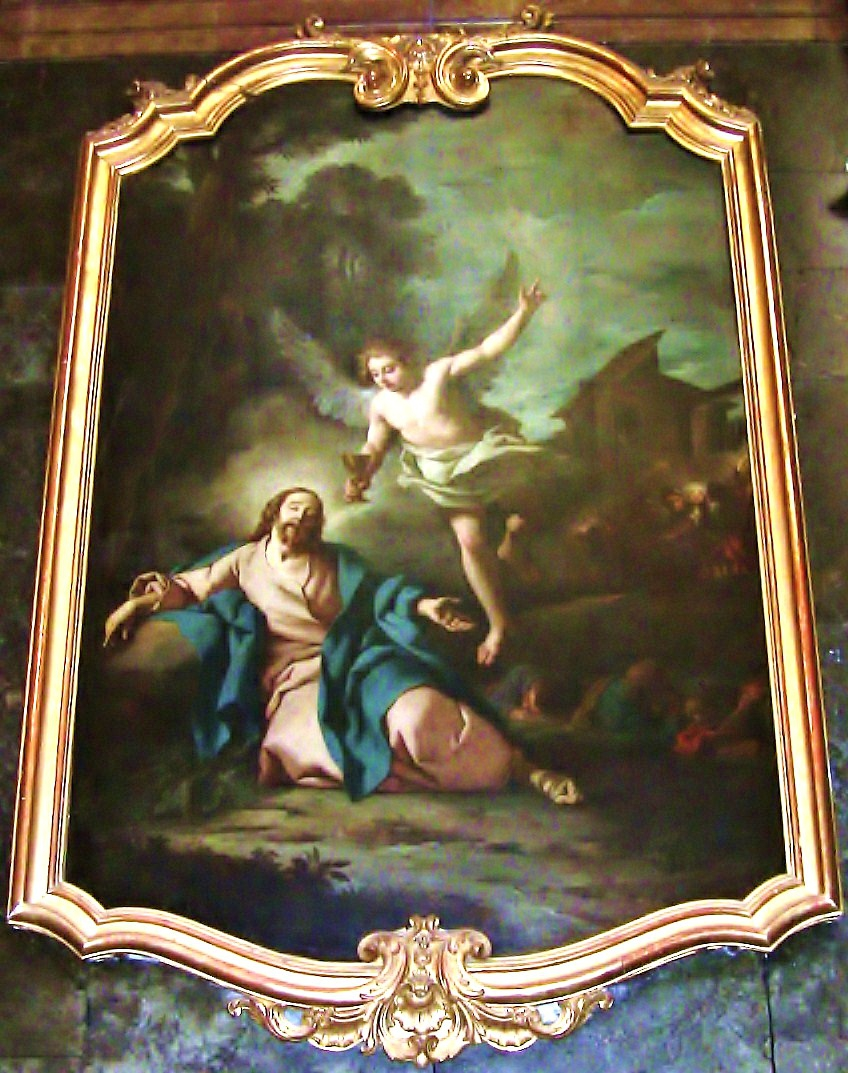
Le Christ au jardin des Oliviers

Oil painting – height: 3.20 m – length: 2.40 m – listed as a historic monument.

Le Christ au jardin des Oliviers (Christ in the Garden of Olives or Jesus in the Garden of Olives) is a work by the painter Jean-François de Troy completed in December 17515 and commissioned in March of the same year by the chapter of Besançon4 for the sum of 1500 livres, paid for by four members of the diocese: MM de la Rochelle, du Tartre, de Chargney and de Chavanne. The artist drew his inspiration for this first painting of the cycle from the Gospel according to Luke. The painting has been listed as a historic monument since 1992.

"After going out, he went, as was his custom, to the Mount of Olives. His disciples followed him. When he came to the place, he said to them, 'Pray that you do not fall into temptation. Then he moved away from them, about a stone's throw away, and kneeling, he prayed, saying: Father, if only you would take this cup away from me! But not my will, but yours be done. Then an angel appeared to him in heaven to strengthen him (...) When he had prayed, he got up and came to his disciples, finding them sleeping with sadness (...). As he spoke, a crowd arrived, and one of the twelve, called Judas, went before them (...)".

As can be seen in the background on the right of the painting, Judas, seen in profile, is guiding a troop of advancing soldiers with a torch in the chiaroscuro, and asking for silence with his finger. The sculptor Jean-Jacques Caffieri, who knew Jean-François de Troy during his last years, wrote:

"All people of taste and lovers of painting agree that M. de Troy possessed a superior talent for rendering the truth of characters and passions in his works. I don't think it's possible to express with greater force and naturalness this moment of suffering and despondency caused by the approach of death. This piece, so well rendered, came back to my mind when I witnessed M. de Troy's last sighs. I was struck with astonishment at his perfect resemblance to his Christ in that last moment". – Jean-Jacques Caffieri.

=== Le Portement de la croix ===
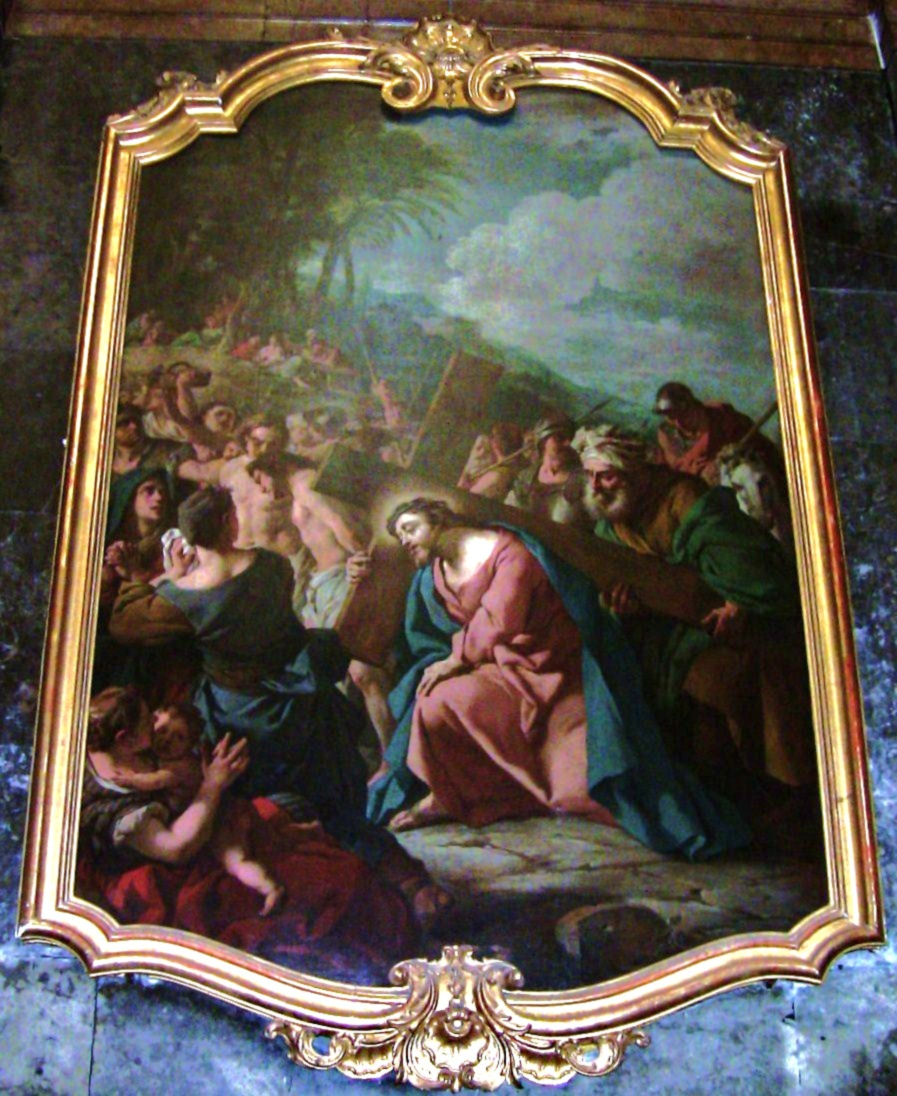
Le portement de Croix

Oil painting – height: 3.20 m – length: 2.40 m – note: signed and dated on a stone lower right "DETROY ECr A ROME/1751" – classification: historical monument.

Le Portement de la croix (The Carrying of the Cross) is a work by the painter Jean-François de Troy executed in December 1751 in Rome and previously commissioned by the Besançon chapter in March of the same year. The Virgin, on the left of the painting, has her hands clasped in a sign of affliction, and Veronique, seen from behind, is clutching the veil she is about to give to Christ.

Christophe Leribault writes in his study of the artist: "As befits the subject, de Troy has here emphasized the diversity of the characters' attitudes, from indifference to hatred. While Simon the Cyrenian supports the cross, one of the executioners, on the right, carries on his head a basket filled with the instruments of passion. In contrast to the Virgin's sorrow, Jesus' pathetic expression, at once overwhelmed and resigned, is particularly emphasized in the center, despite the liveliness of the composition.

The excerpt from M. de Troy's life relates the artist's words on completing this canvas, which was his last work: "c'est ainsi que quand je serais à Paris, je n'ouvrirai point boutique". The painting has been listed as a historic monument since 1992.

==== La Descente de croix ====
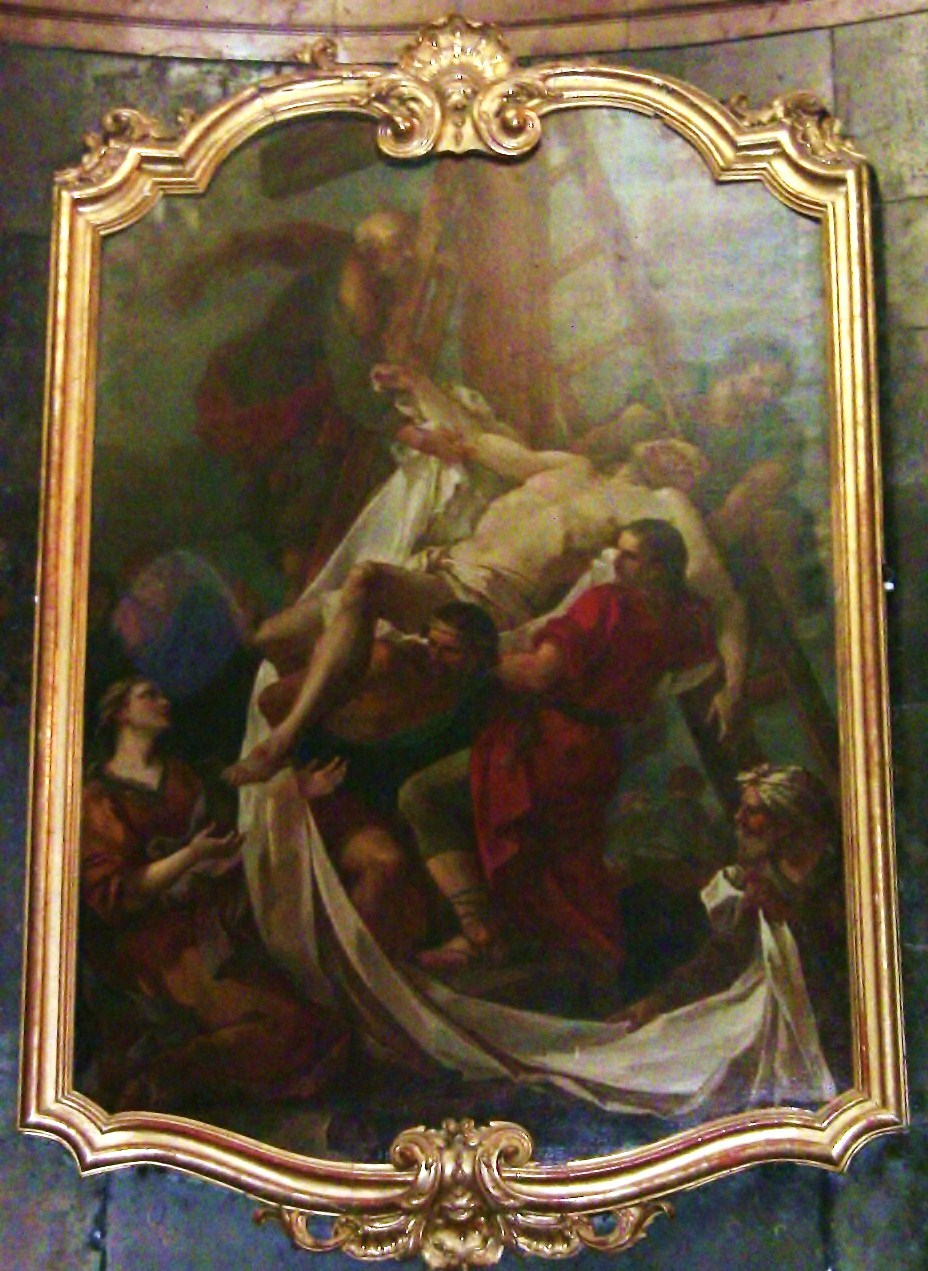
La descente de Croix

Oil painting – height: 3.20 m – length: 2.40 m – classification: historic monument

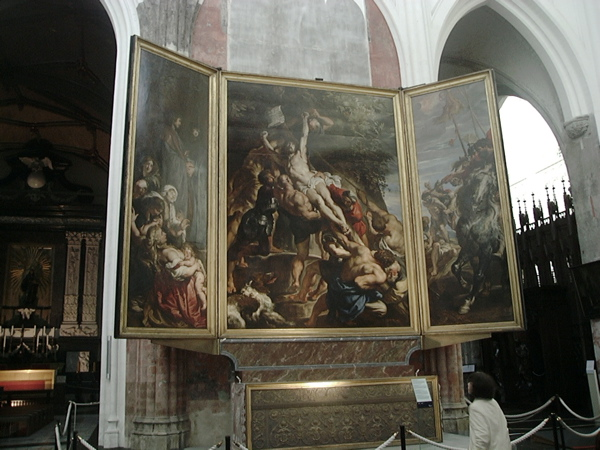
L'Élévation de la croix (The Elevation of the Cross), triptych by Peter Paul Rubens.

La descente de coix (The Descent from the Cross) is a work from the third quarter of the 18th century by painter Charles-Joseph Natoire. The painting is strongly inspired by Rubens' Elevation of the Cross in the heart of Antwerp's Notre-Dame Cathedral. Among the men positioned on ladders on or at the foot of the cross to unhook Christ's body, we see Nicodemus in the upper left, and John, dressed in red, supporting the body of the deceased. In the foreground, we recognize Mary Magdalene by her long red hair, and the Virgin Mary, seated in the half-light at the foot of the cross, her hands clasped in sorrow. The emphasis is on the large arabesque of the shroud, along which Christ's body descends, in keeping with the apse's vocative. Simon of Cyrene holds the end of the shroud, wearing a turban. Pierre Rosenberg discovered a preparatory drawing and a painted sketch of the work at a sale, now in a private collection. The painting has been a historic monument since 1992.

==== La Mise au tombeau ====
Oil painting – height: 3.20 m – length: 2.40 m – listed as a historic monument.

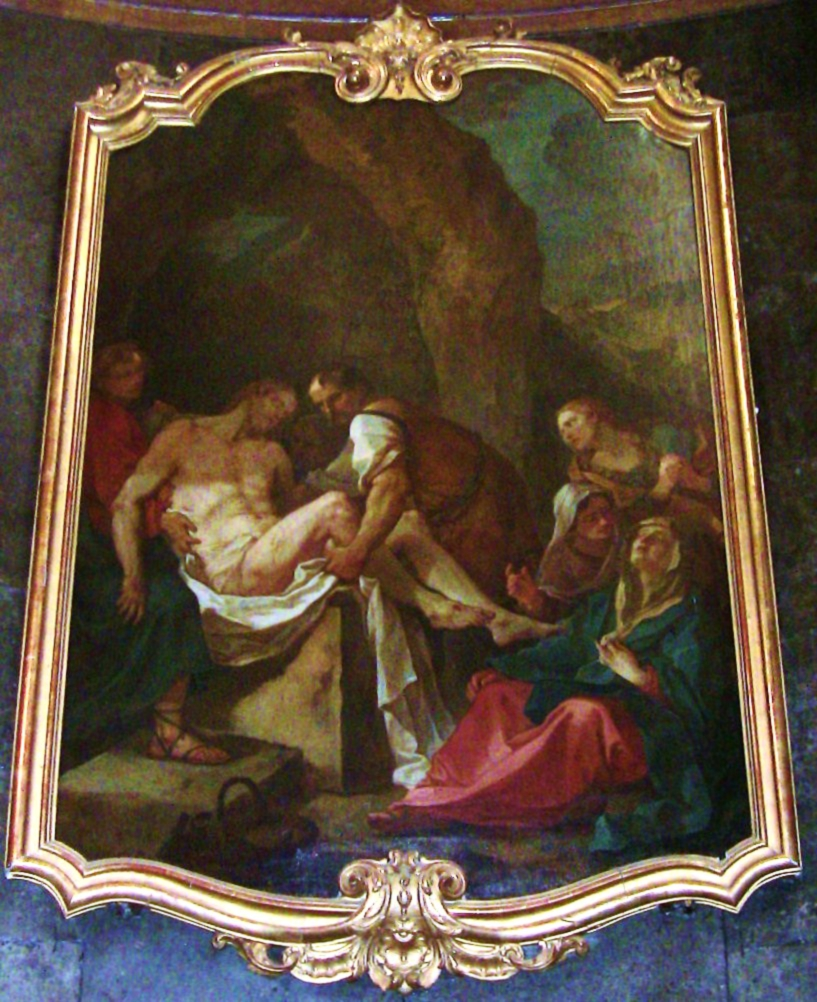
La mise au tombeau (The entombment)

This work by Charles-Joseph Natoire, also undated, is a scene from chapter 15 of the Gospel according to Mark: "And Joseph, having bought a shroud, took Jesus down from the cross, wrapped him in the shroud, and laid him in a tomb hewn out of the rock." Men carry the shrouded body of Christ to a tomb carved out of a rock. The young man dressed in red on the left is most probably the apostle St. John and the old man in the half-light in the background is none other than Simon of Cyrene. The Virgin is supported by a holy woman, having fainted from grief and pain, and Mary Magdalene, with her hair down, can be seen at her side, wringing her hands. In the foreground, we see the crown of thorns lying on the ground, along with the pliers and nails used to crucify Christ. The crosses of Calvary are visible in the background, as is a man holding a ladder. The work has been listed as a historic monument since 1992.

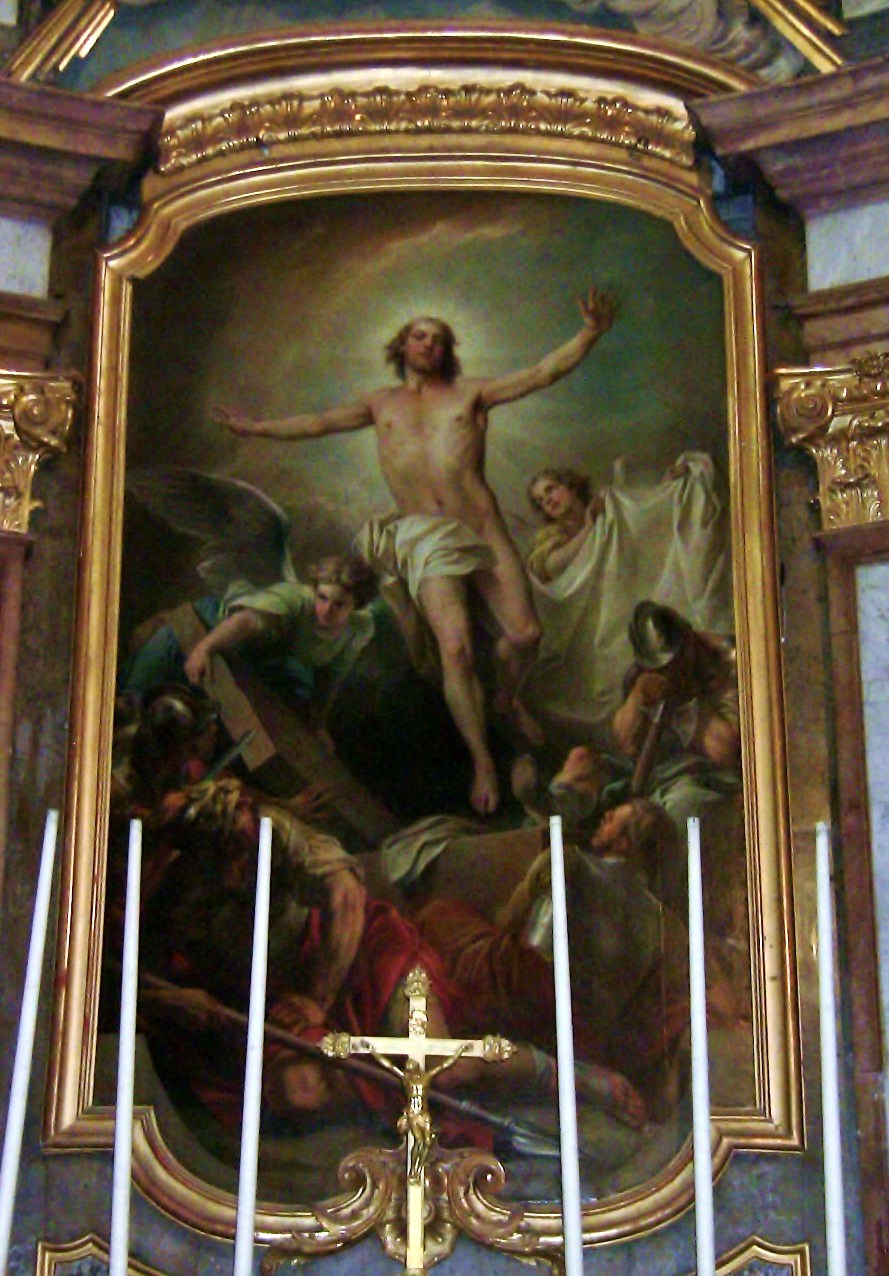
La Résurrection

==== La Résurrection ====
Oil painting - height: 4.28 m - length: 2.62 m classification: historical monument.

La Réssurrection (The Resurrection) is a work dating from the third quarter of the 18th century (probably 1750) by the artist Charles André van Loo. The scene depicts the resurrection of Christ: the stricken guards are astonished and terrified (Saint Longin can be seen with his spear) by the luminous Christ rising from his tomb, his face transfigured and his arms open. On either side of Christ, two joyful angels can be seen, one dressed in blue, lifting the stone that covered the tomb, the other grasping and unfolding the shroud that Jesus is shedding. In Baverel's manuscript no. 88, he writes: "It is truly admirable for the beauty of its colors and the richness of its composition: the body of Christ is of the greatest beauty". The painting has been listed as a historic monument since 1992.

==== Le Martyre de Saint-Étienne ====
Oil painting – height: 1.95 m – length: 2.62 m – note: Signed and dated lower right "DETROY Cr.Sr A ROME/1750" – classification: historical monument.

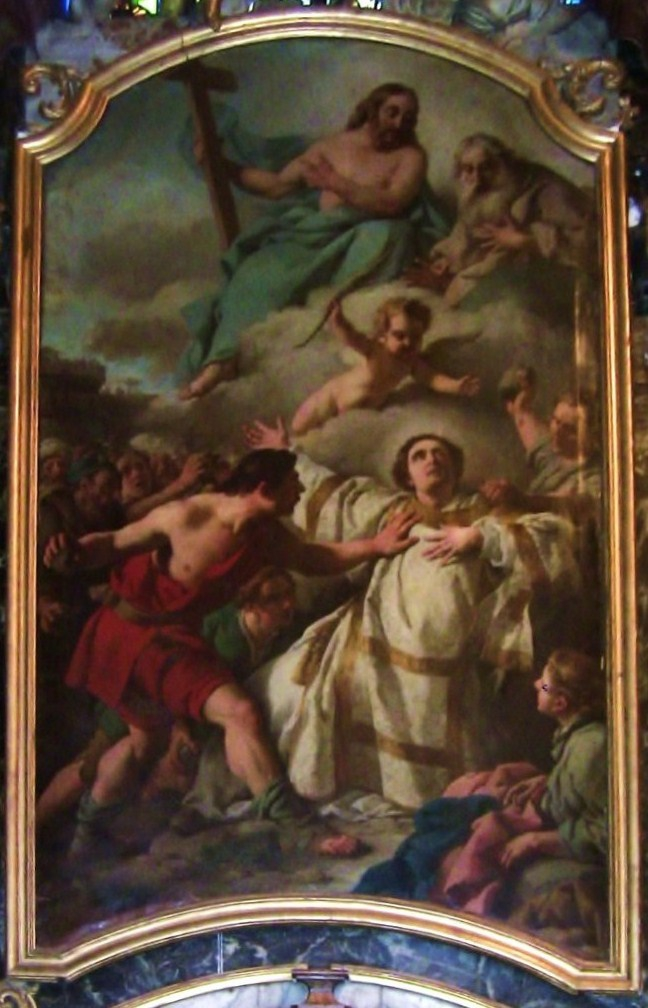
Le Martyre de Saint-Etienne

Le Martyre de Saint-Étienne ou La lapidation de Saint-Étienne (The Martyrdom of Saint Stephen) is a work by Jean-François de Troy completed in 1750. The scene it depicts is taken from chapter VI of the Acts of the Apostles: But he, being full of the Holy Spirit, gazed into heaven and saw the glory of God, and Jesus standing at the right hand of God, and said, “Look! I see the heavens opened and the Son of Man standing at the right hand of God!” Then they cried out with a loud voice, stopped their ears, and ran at him with one accord; and they cast him out of the city and stoned him. And the witnesses laid down their clothes at the feet of a young man named Saul." Canon Quinnez described the work in 1914: "With one hand over his heart and the other outstretched, St. Stephen, in a deacon's tunic, is on his knees, his pleading eyes raised to heaven. He then sees God the Father appear in the clouds, with Jesus armed with his cross at his right. A little angel precedes him, bearing the martyr's palm. The murderers rush to tear him to pieces. One of them grabs him and goes to strike him. In the foreground, calm and tranquil, Saul, apprentice persecutor, and future apostle, watches over tunics and cloaks."

==== La Prédication de saint Ferréol et de saint Ferjeux ====
Oil painting – height: 3.10 m – length: 2.30 m – note: Signed and dated on one of the temple steps "C. NATOIRE f. ROMÆ 1754" – classification: historic monument.

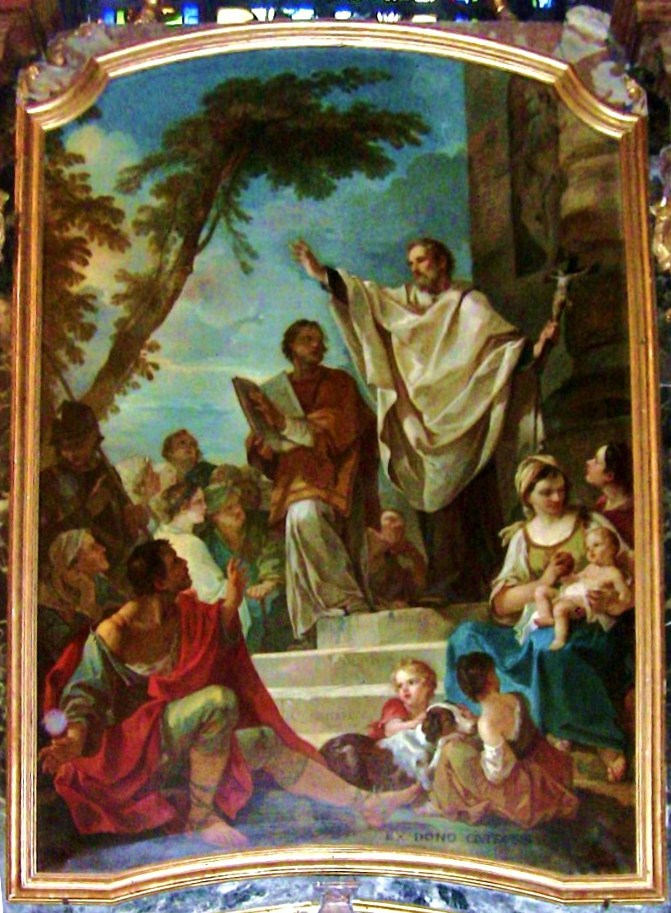
La Prédication de saint Ferréol et de saint Ferjeux

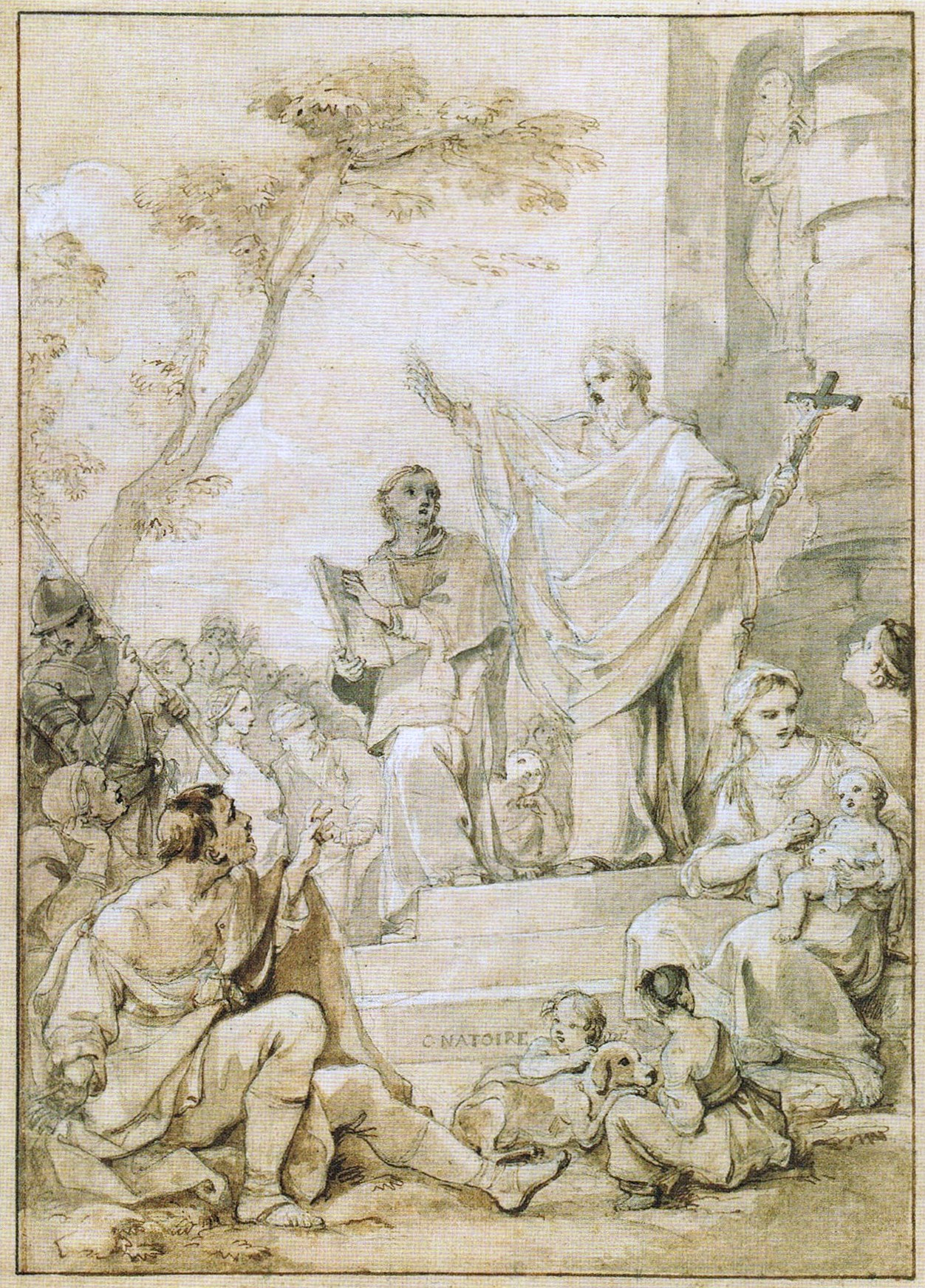
La Prédication de saint Ferréol et de saint Ferjeux

La Prédication de saint Ferréol et de saint Ferjeux (The preaching of Saint Ferréol and Saint Ferjeux) is a painting by Charles-Joseph Natoire executed in 1754, and was classified as a historic monument in 200218. Canon Quinnez described the work in 1914: "The scene takes place near a temple, with a ringed column and a statue of a god in a niche. Against a background of blue sky, the branches of a tree shelter the listeners. Elevated by the temple staircase, dressed in white, Ferréol preaches, a crucifix raised in his left hand. Next to him and slightly behind, Ferjeux, dressed as a deacon, presents the book of the Gospels, which he holds open. The group of listeners is neither lacking in interest nor variety: old men, men, women, young girls, children, and soldiers, all press forward together so as not to miss any of the apostle's words. A smiling mother amuses her child with an apple. A little boy caresses a young dog while his sister looks on from behind."

The painting was paid for by the city of Besançon after delivery. The inscription "EX DONO CIVITATIS" added to the bottom of the canvas bears witness to this.

In 2005, the Musée des Beaux-Arts et d'Archéologie de Besançon acquired a preparatory drawing dating from 1751. This sketch, measuring 43.2 centimeters high by 28.7 centimeters wide, is a work in its own right, astonishing for its attention to detail.

=== South aisle chapels ===
==== La Vierge de Pitié ====
Oil painting – height: 1.38 m – length: 1.04 m – classification: historic monument.

La Vierge de Pitié (The Virgin of Pity or Pietà) was probably painted around 1630 by an anonymous painter. The work is an expression of the Christocentric piety that developed after the Council of Trent in the 17th century. The canvas on wood was inspired by a painting, completed in 1611, by the artist Peter Paul Rubens, displayed in the Cathedral of Our Lady in Antwerp. This Pietà supports Christ on his knees, and three-quarters of the canvas is taken up by the body of the crucified man, surrounded by the Virgin with her sorrowful face raised to heaven and supported by Saint John and Joseph of Arimathea, whose gaze, along with that of a holy woman in the background, is turned towards the supplicant.

==== Le Miracle de saint Théodule ====
Oil painting – height: 1.32 m – length: 1.56 m – note: the Chifflet family coat of arms (Gules a saltire Argent, in chief a snake Or biting its tail) is inscribed – classification: monument historique.

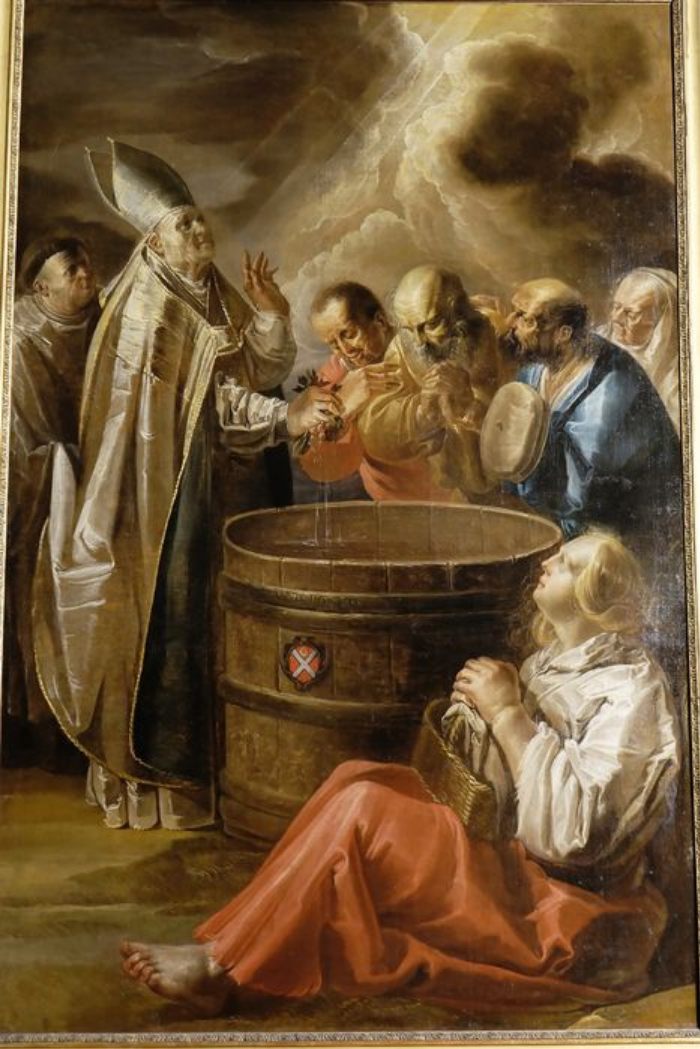
Miracle of St. Theodule

Le Miracle de saint Théodule (The Miracle of Saint Theodule) is a canvas by Van de Venne Jan painted in 1629. In 1647, Jules Chifflet sent the canvas to his brother Jean. It was to be placed on the altar of the chapel in Saint Étienne Cathedral dedicated to Saint Théodule, and containing relics donated by Count Otton I. When St. Stephen's was destroyed in 1674, the painting was transferred to St. John's Cathedral. The painting depicts Saint Theodule, then bishop of Sion in Valais, surrounded by winegrowers. In his right hand, he presses a bunch of grapes from which abundant juice gushes out, filling a large vat.

==== La Vierge de Passignano ====
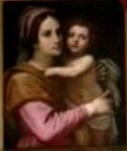
Notre Dames des Ondes

Canvas – height: 0.75 m – width: 0.62 m.

The former Saint-Martin chapel was conceived as a showcase for this Passignano Madonna, long known in Besançon as Notre-Dame des Jacobins.

This is an unsigned canvas painting, but it is known to have been painted around 1630 by Domenico Cresti, known as Le Passignano. The work was brought back from Rome in 1632 by Canon Claude Menestrier, who paid him ten gold ecus for it. Around Marseille, the galley on which the canon was sailing was shipwrecked. Only the small canvas was found intact, after three days in the sea. This vicissitude earned her the first name of "Notre-Dame des Ondes". On January 2, 1633, at Menestrier's request, Antoine Alviset, parish priest of Saint-Pierre church in Besançon, handed the painting over to Father Ratelier, before the Jacobins de Rivotte, during mass, as Menestrier had promised to do, given the flourishing Rosary devotion in this Dominican convent. In 1654, a copy of the painting that was to be used by the engraver Pierre de Loisy remained in the fire for several hours without being consumed. In 1790, the Jacobins were expelled from their convent; the Miraculous Virgin, venerated as a survivor of water and fire, was transported to Saint-Jean Cathedral in 1791. An inventory dated 22 nivôse an IV (January 12, 1796) indicates that "this painting is in a wooden, gilded and sculpted frame, with a glass that is locked at the front".

The motto above the painting used to read: "Burgundiæ juge præsidium": "[Here is] the uninterrupted help of Burgundy".

==== Paintings in the Sacré-Coeur chapel ====
Oil painting – height: 1.85 m – length: 0.95 m – listed as a historic monument.

The Sacré-Coeur chapel, whose crypt houses the tombs of eight of the sovereign counts of Franche-Comté de Bourgogne, features eight paintings on canvas by Bisontin painter Édouard Baille during the 19th century. These canvases are, in fact, copies of ancient frescoes dating back to the 15th century, which adorned the tombs of the "Cimetière des Comtes", originally located in the former cathedral of Saint-Étienne. All these works have been classified as historic monuments since 1992.

They include:

- Reginald I (986–1057): in knightly costume, left hand resting on his helmet;
- William I, called the Great (1020–1087), father of Pope Calixtus II: as a knight, standing before the altar surmounted by a crucifix;
- Reginald III (1093- January 19, 1148), father of Empress Beatrix: wearing on his cuirass a mantle gallooned Or and lined Azure;
- Gaucher III, Sire de Salins (c. 1088 - August 15, 1175): in a blue tunic with a golden coat over his shoulders, lined with ermine, his right hand resting on a staff;
- Géraud or Gérard I, Count of Vienne and Mâcon (1124- November 19, 1184): dressed as a knight, with a red tunic edged in ermine and embellished with a golden eagle on his breastplate;
- Étienne de Vienne, archbishop-elect of Besançon (died June 11, 1193): hands clasped, wearing a chasuble;
- Otto I (1170–1200): wearing a blue tunic embroidered with gold and cinched at the waist with a red sash over his breastplate;
- Étienne de Bourgogne, canon of Besançon: in canon costume and ermine trim, with a square cap on his head and his right hand resting on a book; he was not buried in the cathedral, as he died in Rome on April 4, 1299. But his heart was brought back to rest among the relics of his ancestors.
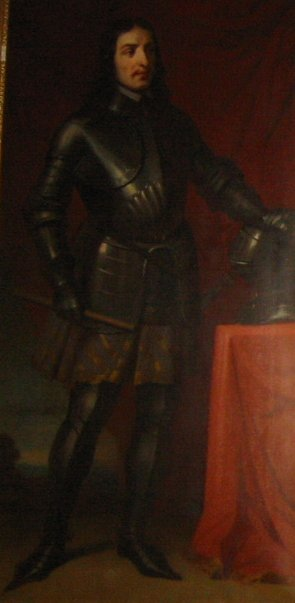
  Reginald I
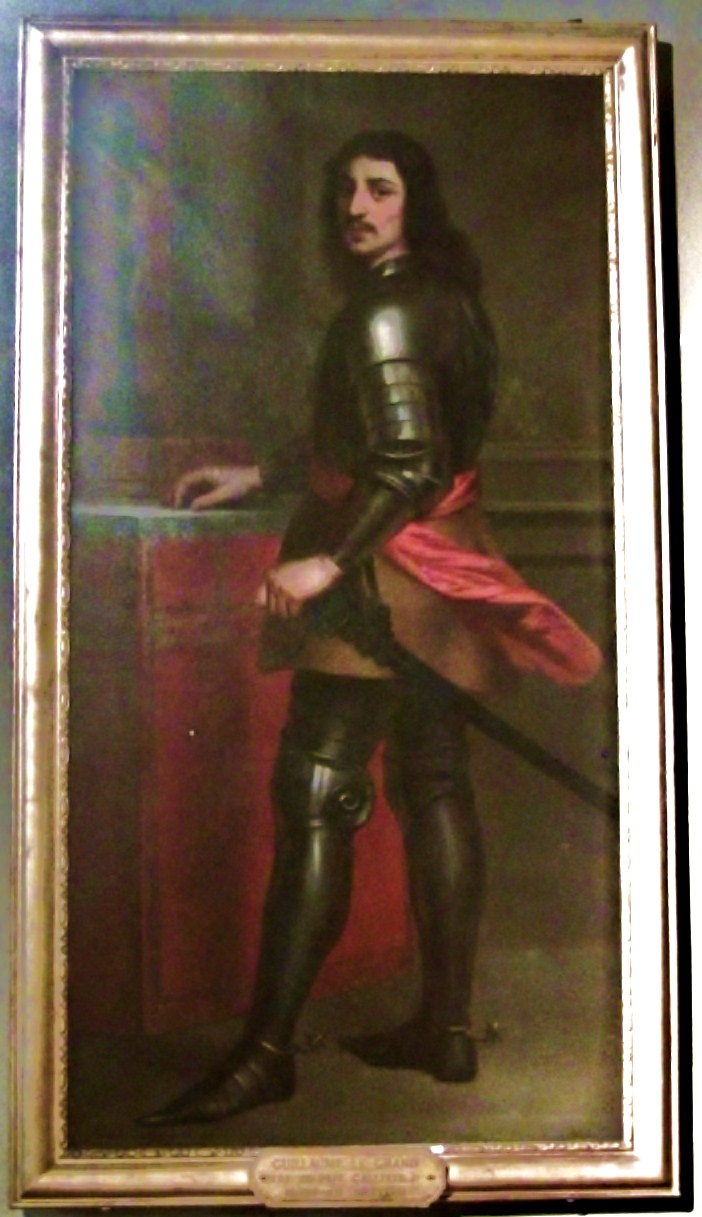
  William I, the Great
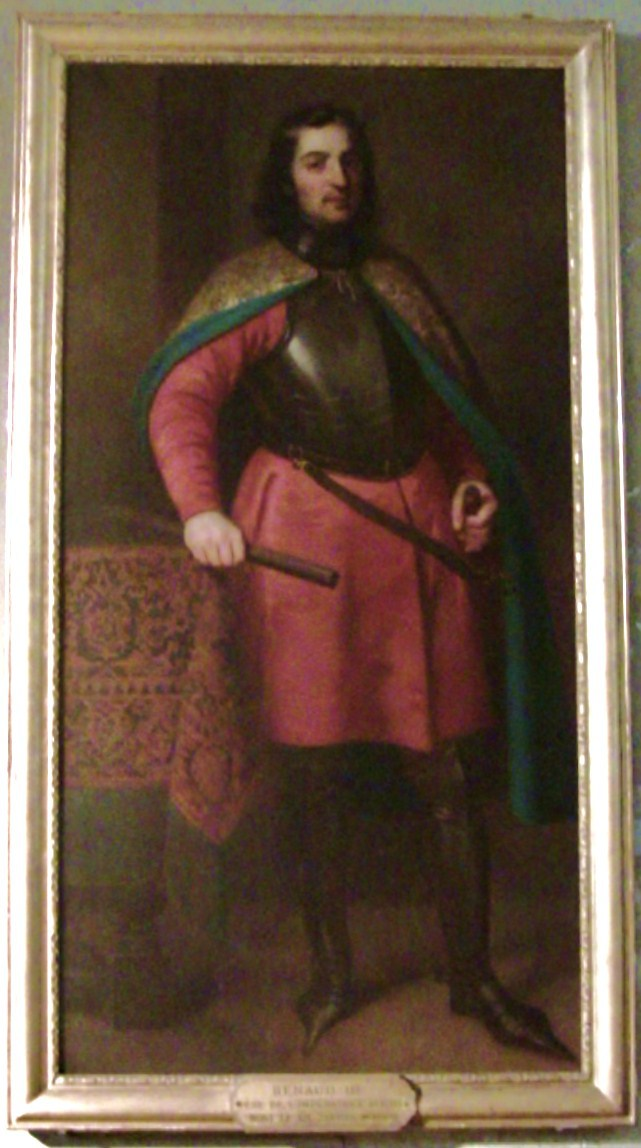
  Reginald III
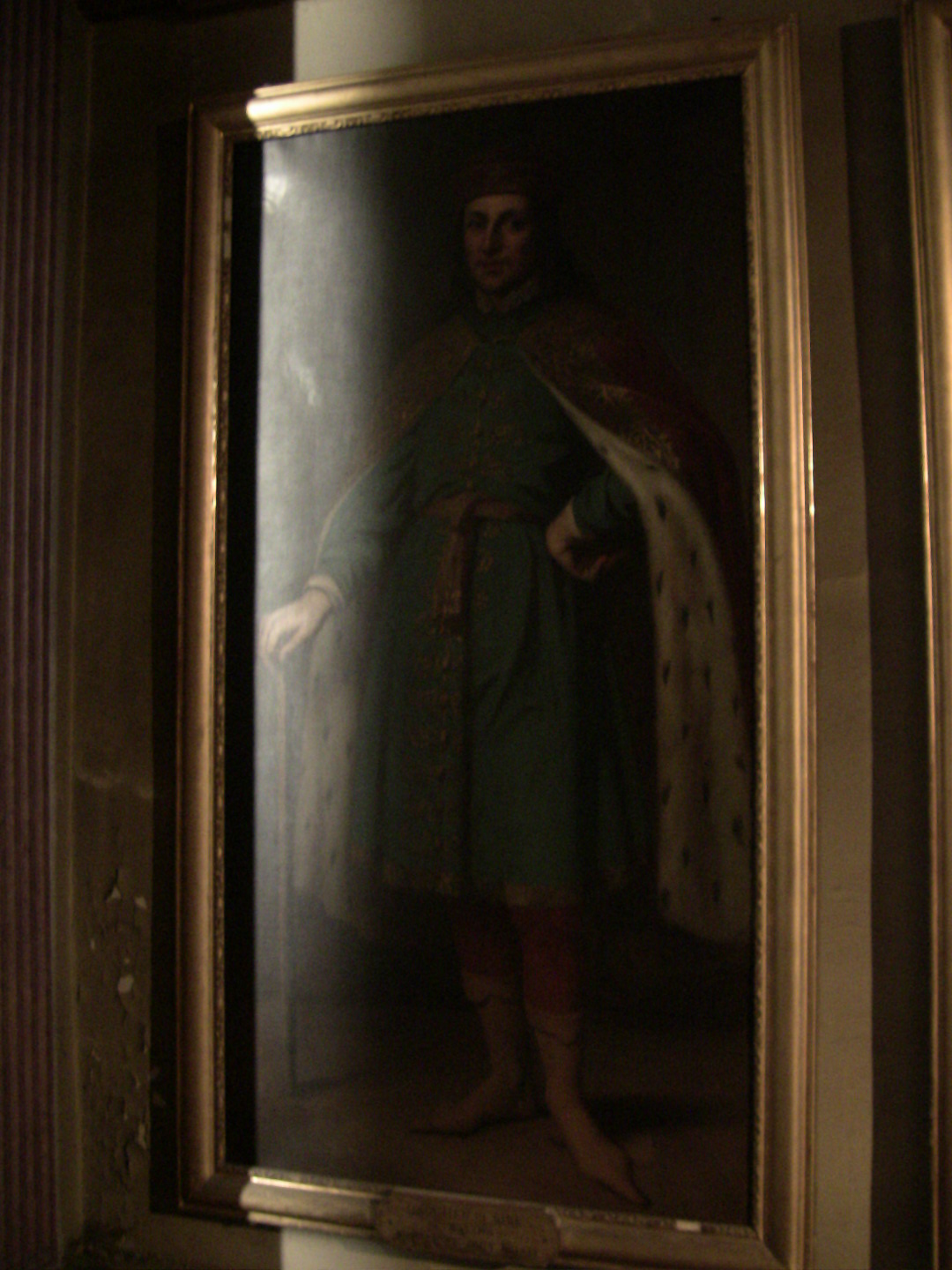
  Gaucher III
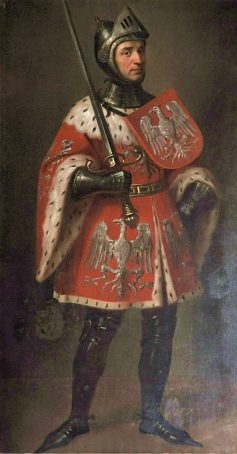
  Gérard I
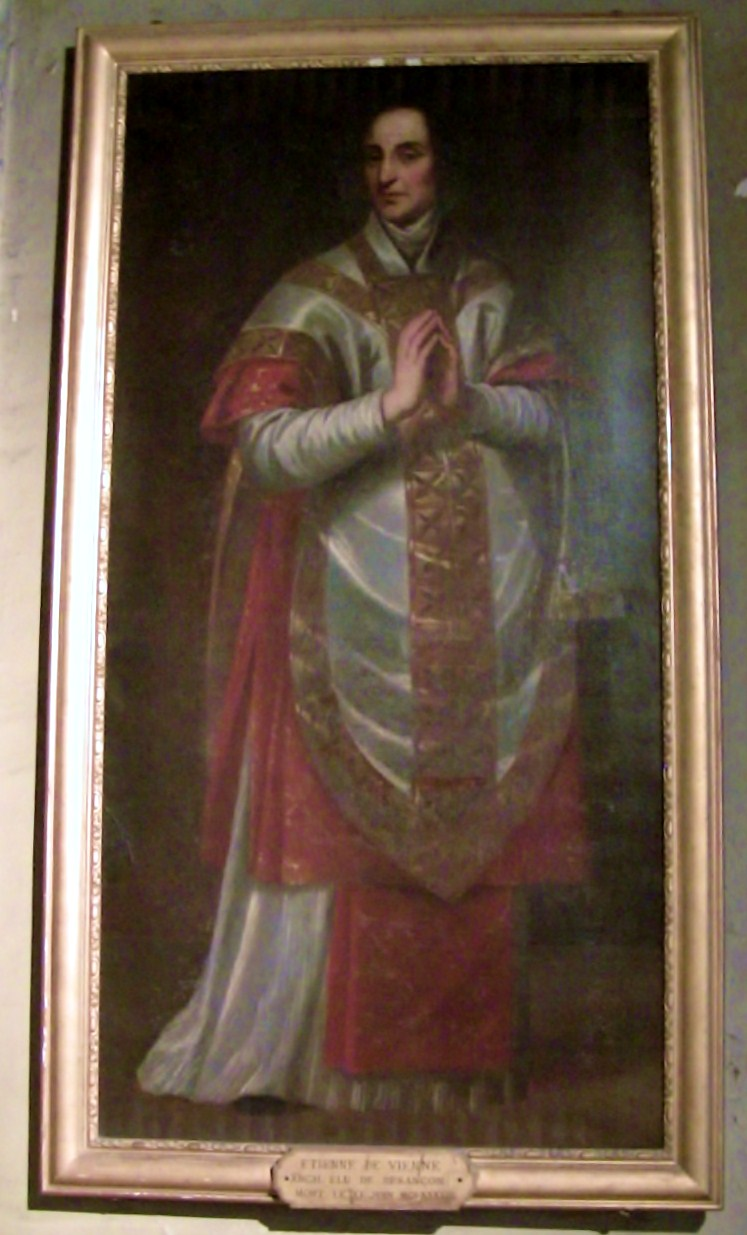
  Étienne de Vienne
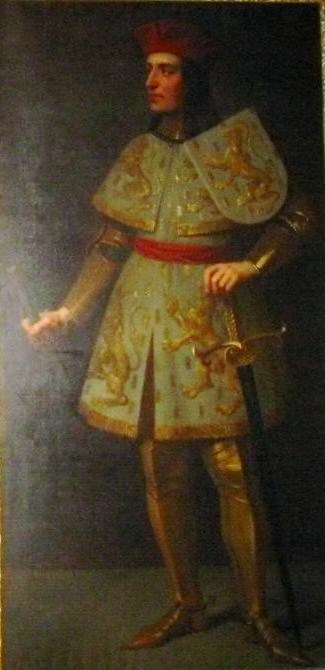
  Otto I
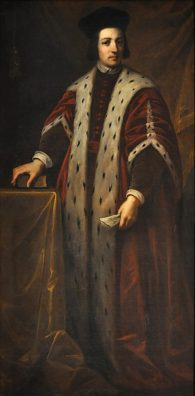
  Étienne de Bourgogne

==== The paintings in the Chapel of the Week ====
1. In 1905, the archbishop of Besançon, Mgr Fulbert Petit, conceived the idea of moving the Blessed Sacrament to the Chapelle Saint-Denis, now known as the "Chapelle du Chapitre" or "Chapelle de la Semaine". The old altarpiece was then removed. The archbishop wished to apply an appropriate iconography. This explains why the paintings on canvas decorating the walls all have some connection with the Eucharist. The author of all these works, all dating from 1905, is the painter Henri Rapin.
2. The showbread: height: 2 m – width: 2.90 m, with the motto underneath: "Melchisedec, King of Salem, brought the bread and wine and blessed Abram".
3. Moses strikes the rock: height: 2 m – width: 2.90 m. Motto: "You will strike the rock, and water will come out of it, and the people will drink.
4. Promise of the Eucharist: height: 2 m – width: 2.90 m. Motto: "Jesus said to them, ‘I am the bread of life; he who comes to me shall not hunger'".
5. The Last Supper: height: 2 m – length: 9.05 m. Motto: "Jesus took the bread, gave thanks, broke it, gave it to the disciples, and said, "Take and eat, this is my body". Having also taken the cup and given thanks, he gave it to them, saying, "Drink from it, all of you, for this is my blood, the blood of the new covenant".
6. The multiplication of the loaves: height: 2 m – width: 2.90 m. Motto: "Having broken the loaves, he gave them to the disciples, and the disciples to the people".
7. The Manna: height: 2 m – width: 2.90 m. Motto: "So each man gathered as much each morning as he needed".
8. Abraham's sacrifice: height: 2 m – width: 2.90 m. Motto: "But the angel of the Lord said to him: ‘Do not lay your hand on the child".

=== North aisle ===
==== Vision de Saint Jérôme ====
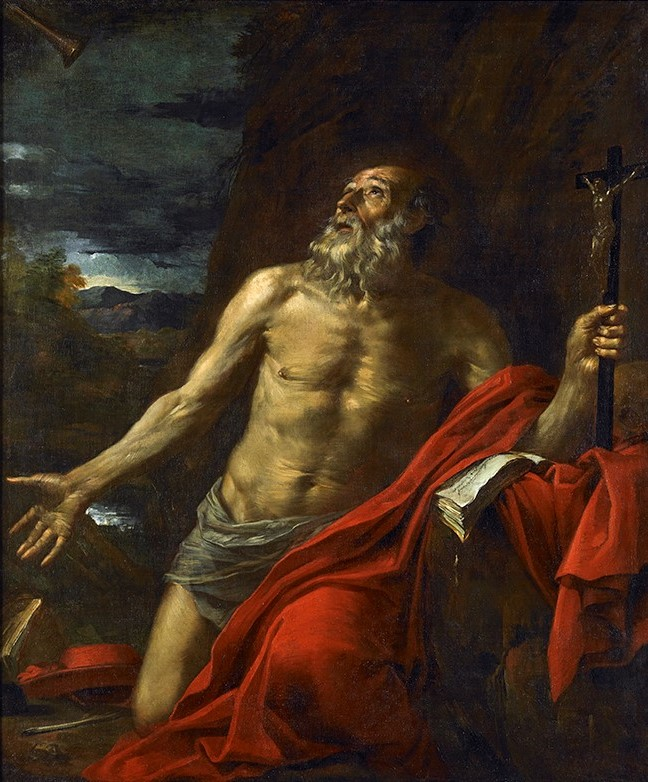
Vision de Saint Jérôme

The red hat and tunic identify Jerome de Stridon, who lived as a hermit near Bethlehem, where he translated the Old and New Testaments into Latin. This is a 17th-century painting from Italy.

The ascetic is in a position of fear and availability, with the crucifix in his hand. Seized with surprise, he has dropped his stylus, which now lies on the ground. In the upper left-hand corner, the tip of a trumpet can be seen. The sounding of this instrument is an allusion to an apocryphal letter by the saint in which he wrote: "Whether I am awake or asleep, I always believe I hear the trumpet of Judgment".

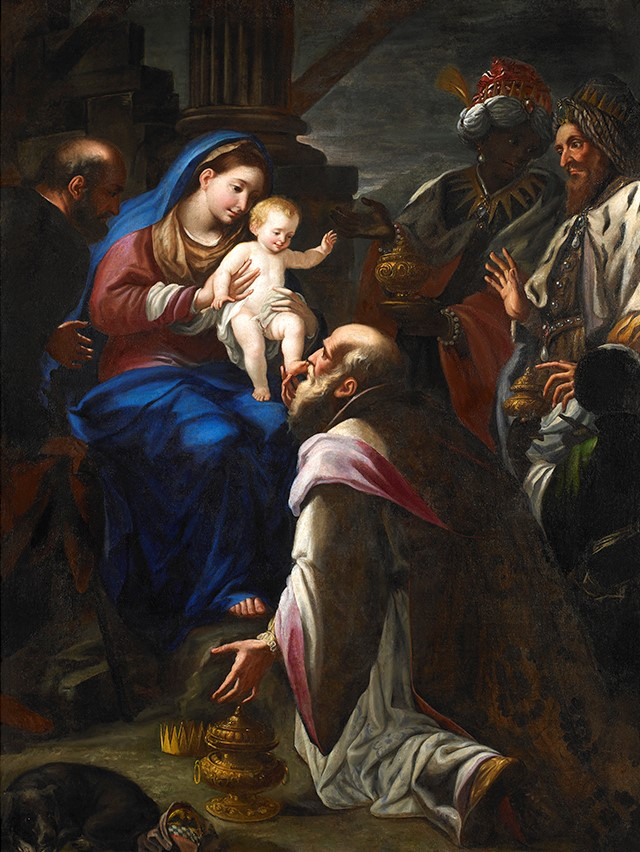
L'adoration des Mages

==== L'adoration des Mages ====
The attribution of this 17th-century Lombard painting is unknown. The use of light coming from the upper left corner of the painting and the play of chiaroscuro show the influence of Caravaggio in Northern Italy.

==== La Vierge aux saints ====
Oil painting – height: 2.52 m – length: 2.23 m – classification: historic monument.

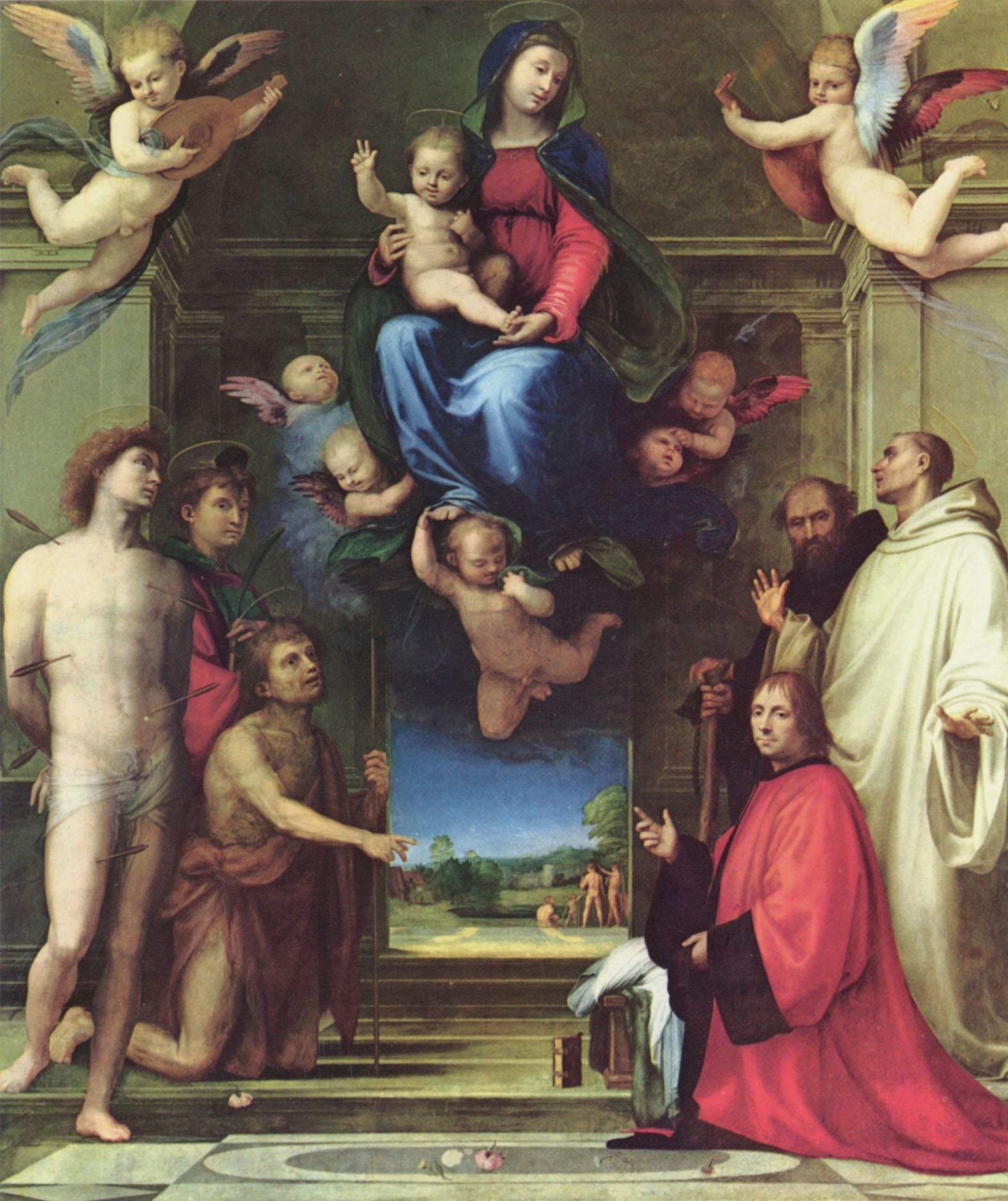
La Vierge aux saints.

La Vierge aux saints (The Madonna of the Saints) is a painting on wood dating from 1512. A masterpiece of the Italian Renaissance, the painting was executed by the Tuscan painter Fra Bartolomeo, known as Baccio della Porta. The painting features the Virgin and Child, St. Sebastian, St. Stephen, St. John the Baptist, St. Anthony, St. Bernard, and Ferry Carondelet.

The work was once surmounted by a lunette depicting the crowning of the Virgin by Christ, painted by Mariotto Albertinelli. Ferry Carondelet donated the painting to the church of Saint-Étienne in Besançon, which received it on May 26, 1518. The work was listed as a historic monument in 1992.

==== La Vierge de Pitié ====
Oil painting – height: 1.32 m – length: 1.56 m – classification: historic monument.

La Vierge de Pitié (The Virgin of Pity) is a canvas probably from 1540–1550 by an unknown artist. This Pietà, whose attribution is still a matter of debate (although a Flemish artist who spent time in Rome is favored), pays homage to a famous work by Michelangelo completed in 1498–1499 for Cardinal Jean Bilhères de Lagraulas. The motif borrowed from Michelangelo's sculpture, placed at the center of the composition, is depicted at the entrance to the sepulcher, where a tree, both dry and green, symbolizes death and resurrection, while on the horizon appears fortified Jerusalem.

==== La Mort de Saphire ====
La Mort de Saphire (The Death of Sapphira) by artist Franken Ambrosius was completed in 1629 and came from the former Saint-Etienne cathedral. The painting depicts Sapphira being struck by lightning in front of Christ's disciples after she had broken God's word. The scene is directly inspired by one of the passages in the Acts of the Apostles and features the crowd of disciples in the background against a monumental architectural backdrop, with St. Peter receiving the gifts of the faithful. The sinner can be seen being carried by her loved ones, while the crowd in the foreground looks on. The work was first attributed to the Italian painter Le Tintoretto, then to Jacob de Baccker, and finally to Ambrosius Francken, whose similar iconography is preserved in the Krakow Museum in Poland.

=== Other tables ===
Name		Date	Painter	Dimensions	Classification	Notes	References
1	Le Christ en croix	1699	Francesco Trevisani	Approx. 2.38 meters high and 2.30 meters long.	Monument historique (1992)	Oil painting of Christ crucified, commissioned by the Besançon Chapter around 1699.	
2	Le Christ Mort	1733	Sebastiano Conca	Measures not taken.	Monument historique (1992)	Work from the archbishop's palace.	
3	La Mise au tombeau	16th century	Le Bassan	Approx. 1.50 m high by 1.00 m long.	Monument historique (1992)	Work from the archbishop's palace.	
4	Renobert et Pierre Chevroton	First quarter of the 16th century.	Unknown	Approx. 1.60 m high by 0.60 m long.	Monument historique (1992)	Canvas on wood from the archbishop's palace. Renobert Chevroton was abbot of Montbenoît and Pierre Chevroton was captain of Ornans.	
5	Sainte Marguerite	17th century	Unknown	Approx. 1.00 meter high by 0.81 meter long	Monument historique (1992)	Canvas on wood.	
6	Le Martyre de saint Étienne	1678	Jacques-Joseph Baudot	Height approx. 1.58 metres, length approx. 1.95 metres	Monument historique (1992)	Canvas on wood, based on a version by Lebrun, with the note "JACOBUS JOSEPHUS BAUDOT BISUNTINUS PINGEBAT ANNO 1678" in the lower right-hand corner.	
7	Saint Jean à la Porte Latine	17th century	Unknown	Approx. 1.58 m high by 1.95 m long.	Monument historique (1992)	Canvas on wood.	
8	La Prédication de saint Ferjeux	17th century	Jean-François Baudot	Approx. 1.55 m high by 1.50 m long.	Monument historique (1992)	Canvas on wood.	
9	Le Martyre des saints Ferréol et Ferjeux	17th century	Jean-François Baudot	Approx. 1.55 metres high by 1.50 metres long	Monument historique (1992)		
10	Le Martyre de saint Vincent	1679	Jean-François Baudot	Approx. 1.55 m high by 1.50 m long.	Monument historique (1992)		
11	Saint Jean à Patmos (de Baudot)	17th century	Jean-François Baudot	Approx. 1.55 m high by 1.50 m long.	Monument historique (1992)		
12	Saint Jean à Patmos (de Colson)	1827	Guillaume-Francis Colson	Approx. 2.80 metres high and 2.50 metres long.	Monument historique (1992)		

== Works inaccessible to the public ==
The works currently inaccessible to the public are:

Name		Date	Painter	Dimensions	Classification	Notes	References
1	La Vierge à l'Enfant	Fourth quarter of the 16th century.	Unknown	Approx. 0.92 meters high by 0.67 meters long.	Monument historique (1992)	Oil painting depicting the Virgin Mary holding a child.	
2	La Tête de saint Jean-Baptiste	1561	Unknown	Approx. 0.33 metre high by 0.38 metre long.	Monument historique (1992)	Wood-mounted canvas depicting the head of St. John the Baptist on a carved block.	
3	Saint François de Sales	nineteenth century	Unknown	Approx. 1.07 m high by 1.56 m long.	Monument historique (1992)	Canvas on gilded wood.	
4	Le Sacrifice de Melchisédech(front), and Saint Évêque (reverse)	Unknown	Unknown	Approx. 1.20 m high by 0.53 m long.	Monument historique (1992)	Painted on wood and gilded on both sides.	

== See also ==
- Besançon Cathedral
- St. Stephen's Cathedral, Besançon
- Bensançon
- Deposition of Christ (Bronzino)
- Sacré-Cœur, Paris
- Musée des Beaux-Arts et d'Archéologie de Besançon
- Francesco Trevisani
- Sebastiano Conca

== Bibliography ==
- de Vregille, Bernard; Vergnolle, Éliane; Deridder, Annick; Brunet, Pascal; Gavinet, Jean-Pierre; Chauve, Pierre (2006). La cathédrale Saint-Jean de Besançon (in French). Besançon: Les cahiers de la Renaissance du vieux Besançon. ISSN 1276-6771.
- Monnie, Chloé (2015). Cathédrale de Besançon, trésors cachés. Amis de la Cathédrale de Strasbourg. ISBN 9782953109351.
- McManus, Blanche. The Cathedrals of Southern France. (n.d.). United States: Library of Alexandria. Library of Alexandria. ISBN 9781465544353.
- Foer, Joshua; Thuras, Dylan; Morton, Ella (2016). Atlas Obscura: An Explorer's Guide to the World's Hidden Wonders. Workman Publishing Company. ISBN 9780761189671.
- Ferree, Barr (1894). The Chronology of the Cathedral Churches of France.
