= Félix Gaffiot =

French philologist and teacher

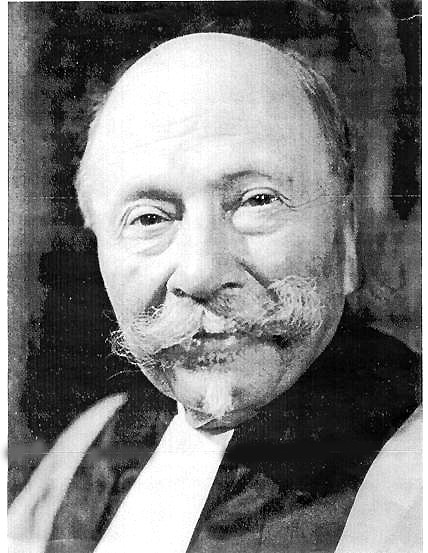
Félix Gaffiot Portrait

Félix Gaffiot (French: [feliks ɡafjo]; 27 September 1870 – 2 November 1937) was a French philologist and teacher. He was the author of the renowned 1934 work Dictionnaire Illustré Latin-Français (Illustrated Latin–French Dictionary), which is commonly referred to as the Gaffiot.

== Life ==
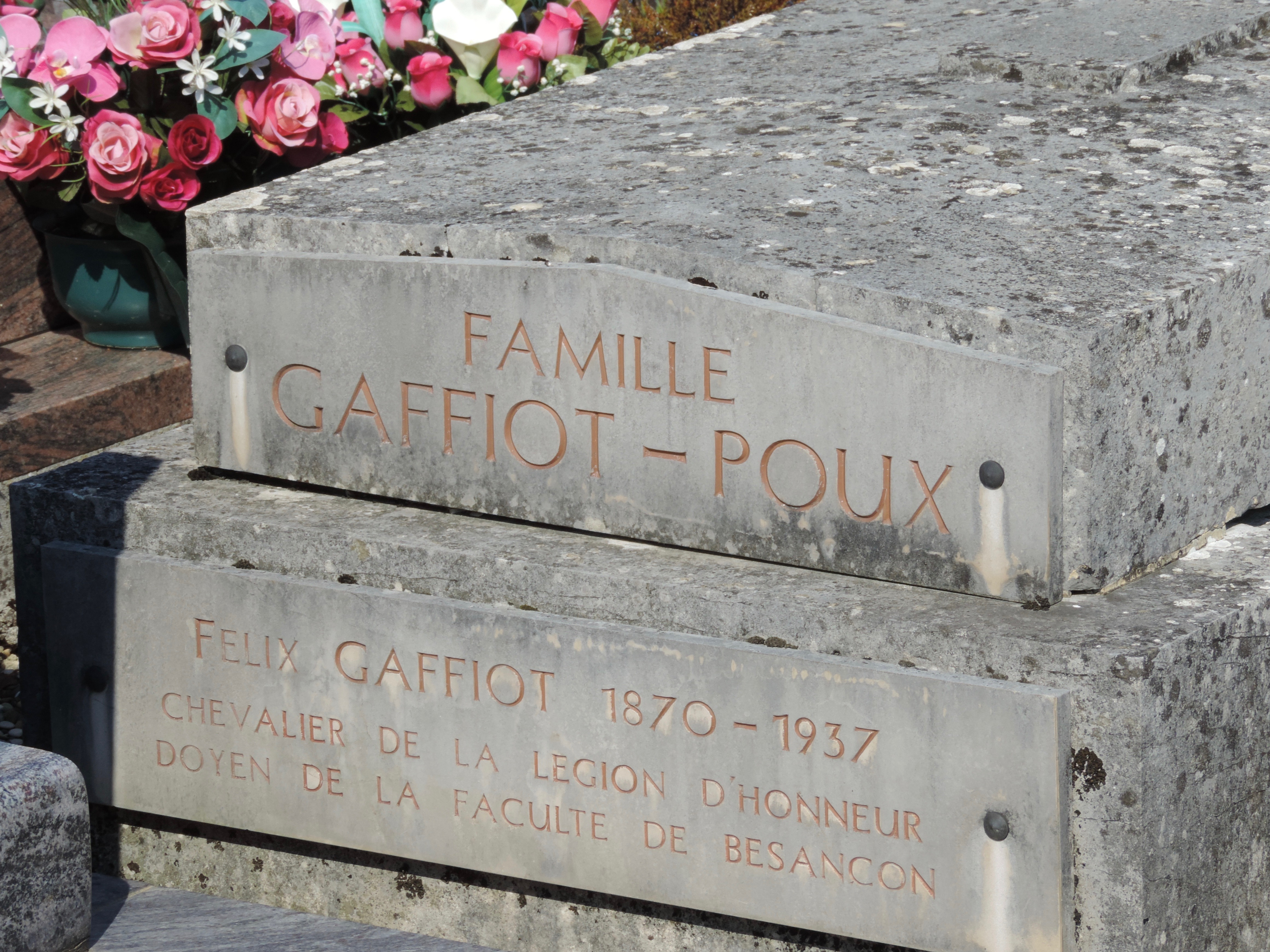
The tombstone of Félix Gaffiot in Liesle, Doubs.

Félix Gaffiot was born in Liesle, in the Loue valley. He was the son of a teacher (his father) and a town clerk (his mother). Fatherless by the age of thirteen, he was nevertheless able to attend secondary school in Pontarlier thanks to a municipal scholarship. Having attained a Bachelor of Science and Letters, he was reluctant to prepare for the entrance examination to the École Polytechnique, and eventually undertook an arts degree. He obtained his first teaching position at Pont-à-Mousson, all the while preparing for the agrégation. He then taught for twelve years in the Massif Central at Le Puy-en-Velay and Clermont-Ferrand. He studied the rules of Latin grammar, which he considered "absolute and conventional". These led, in 1906, to his doctoral thesis on Latin-language acquisition; upon obtaining the agrégation, he became a professor at the Sorbonne.

Gaffiot developed his pedagogical theories in his 1910 work Méthode de langue latine (Method of the Latin language); in it, he advocated following the development of the French language from its Latin roots. His work was interrupted by the outbreak of World War I in 1914 and his subsequent mobilisation as an auxiliary medical officer in the Forest of Argonne. Thereafter, Gaffiot focused on painting and his studies at a school of the fine arts.

Following disputes with his colleagues, Gaffiot left the Sorbonne in 1927, even though he was about to be granted tenure; he found a new position for himself at the University of Besançon. He was subsequently appointed Dean of the Faculty of Letters on 19 July 1933; he was reappointed to that role in 1936. He retired from the University in October 1937.

Gaffiot died in November 1937—less than a month after the official date of his retirement—following a car crash on 31 October near Mouchard.[1][2]

There is a college in Quingey that is named for him.

== Dictionnaire Illustré Latin-Français — "The Gaffiot" ==
In 1923, the publisher Hachette entrusted Félix Gaffiot with the task of compiling a Latin–French dictionary, which was soon eponymized Le Gaffiot. After writing thousands of index cards, Gaffiot saw his work appear at last in 1934. The dictionary stands out on account of its illustrations and the clearness of its typography and, since it first appeared, has been regularly reprinted, in both complete and abridged editions. A new, modernised edition of the complete dictionary was published in November 2000.
