= FEMTO-ST Institute =

French research institute

- FEMTO-ST headquarters in Besançon, France
- Established: 2004
- President: Michaël Gauthier
- Members: 700+
- Address: 15B Avenue des Montboucons, Besançon (France)
- Website: FEMTO-ST.fr/en

The FEMTO-ST Institute (Franche-Comté Électronique Mécanique Thermique et Optique - Sciences et Technologies) is a joint research unit (French UMR 6174) between the CNRS, University of Franche-Comté, École nationale supérieure de mécanique et des microtechniques (ENSMM) and Université de technologie de Belfort-Montbéliard. It is part of the association, University of Burgundy - Franche-Comté.

== History ==
This institute was created on 1 January 2004, from the merging of five different Franche-Comté laboratories working in mechanics, optics and telecommunications, electronics, time-frequency, energetics, and fluidics. In 2011, UFC's informatics laboratory was incorporated into FEMTO-ST, becoming the 7th department in the institute.

In January 2012, the LIFC laboratory of the University of Franche-Comté partnered with FEMTO-ST to form a seventh department: the Department of Complex Systems Computing (DISC). Two years later, as a part of the TEMIS Science project, the extension works in the cleanroom were completed by increasing its area by 865 m² more than its initial extension. In 2014, the second part of the project was completed with the opening of the new building which hosts the headquarters and the departments of Optics and MN2S.

FEMTO-ST has become one of the biggest research institutes in the field of science and engineering in France. It has a presence over Franche-Comté on the three geographical sites Besançon, Belfort, and Montbéliard.

== Departments ==
FEMTO-ST Institute is formed by 7 departments, supported by different common services in state-of-the-art micro/nanofabrication, constituting part of the six national technology center networks of CNRS (RENATECH). These departments include energy, MN2S, DISC, time and frequency department, applied mechanics and optics.

=== Energy Department ===
The energy department studies the production systems of conversion and storing of thermal and electric energy.

- SHARPAC: Systèmes électriques Hybrides, ActionneuRs électriques, systèmes Piles A Combustible (Hybrid Electric Systems, Electric Actuators, Fuel Cell Systems)
- Static converters
- Fuel cell systems
- PHIL – Power Hardware in the Loop
- Control and Management of Energy
- Electric actuators
- THERMIE: THermique Écoulements instRuMentatIon et Énergie (Thermal Runoff, Instrumentation, and Energy)
- Metrology and Instrumentation in Fluidics and Thermal Science
- Thermal Science in energy systems
- Heat engines
- Complex flows

=== Micro Nano Sciences and Systems Department (MN2S) ===
The MN2S is a department of FEMTO-ST specialized in the research of micro- and nano-instrumentation, nano-science, micro- and nano-acoustics, microsystems and multiphysics, and the surfaces of micro- and nano-materials. The department is located in Besançon, Montbéliard and Belfort.

Research teams:

- BioInterfaces aNd Devices (BIND)
- MIcro-NAno-MAterials and Surfaces (MINAMAS)
- Micro-Opto-Electro Mechanical Systems (MOEMS)
- NANO2BIO
- Phononics and Microscopy

=== Complex Systems Computer Science Department (DISC) ===
The research conducted in the DISC department is focused on E-health, micro and nanosystems dedicated to health, information safety on the complex systems, MiDi Micro and distributed intelligent nanosystems, and the transport and mobility services. The department is located in Besançon, Montéliard, and Belfort.

Research teams:

- Distributed Numerical Algorithms (AND)
- Distributed Algorithmic Collaboration, Networks, Optimization and Scheduling (CARTOON)
- Optimization, Mobility, Networking (OMNI)
- Verification and validation of software and embedded systems (VESONTIO)

=== Time and Frequency Department ===
This department is specialized in high-stability oscillators, acoustic-electronics and piezoelectrics, and time-frequency metrology. It is composed of three teams:

- ACEPI: Acoustic-electronics and piezoelectrics
- CoSyMA: Composants et Systèmes Micro-Acoustiques (Micro-Acoustic Components and Systems)
- OHMS: Ondes, Horloges, Métrologie et Systèmes (Waves, Clocks, Metrology and Systems)

=== Automatic Control and Micro-Mechatronic Systems Department ===
This department is specialized in robotics, mechatronics, automatic control and artificial intelligence.

It is composed of four teams:

- Control and Design (CODE)
- Biomedical Microrobotics (MiNaRoB)
- Prognostics and Health Management (PHM)
- Sensing strategies, Perception and Characterization at the Micro-Nanoscales (SPECIMEN)

=== Applied Mechanics Department ===
The Applied Mechanics Department is focused on two main areas:

- Micromechanics: materials and processes
- Structures: integration and functionalization

It is composed of 11 teams, each working on these two research areas.

=== Optics Department ===
The Optics Department works on nanometrology, near-field microscopy, integrated optics in lithium niobate, ultrafast optics, nonlinear optics, and opto-electronic dynamics.

Research groups:

- Nano-Optics (NO)
- Nonlinear Optics group (ONL)
- Optoelectronics, Photonics and Telecommunication Optics (OPTO)
- Photonics for Medical Instrumentation (PIM)

== Research quality evaluation ==
The institute received an A+ grade from an evaluation performed by AERES in 2010, placing the institute in the de facto list of the top 30% research laboratories for engineering science in France.
