= Dictionnaire illustré latin-français =

Gaffiot’s Dictionnaire, first edition

The Dictionnaire illustré latin-français (French: [diksjɔnɛːʁ ilystʁe latɛ̃ fʁɑ̃sɛ]; Illustrated Latin–French Dictionary) is a Latin-French bilingual dictionary. Compiled by the French philologist Félix Gaffiot (1870–1937), it is commonly eponymized « Le Gaffiot » ("The Gaffiot") by the French. For Francophone scholars of Latin, the Dictionnaire has become the classic authority of choice. It was first published in 1934, upon completion of the work carried out by Gaffiot, which had been commissioned by the publisher, Hachette.

== Layout and appearance ==
In its original, unabridged form, the Dictionnaire is an imposing work numbering over 1,700 pages. Its illustrations and its typography have made it famous.

The revised and augmented edition of the Dictionnaire, published in November 2000, added a colour atlas, a bibliography, a chronology, the rules of Latin scansion, and tables explaining Roman weights, measures, coinage.

== Reception and augmentation ==
The Dictionnaire superseded the Latin–French dictionary of Quicherat and Daveluy, which had predominated in Francophone studies of Latin since 1844. In the subsequent decades, Gaffiot’s Dictionnaire has established itself everywhere, in both its complete and its abridged editions. In November 2000, a new, modernised edition of the Dictionnaire was published, the fruit of the labours of Pierre Flobert, based on seventy thousand index cards (fifty thousand for common nouns and twenty thousand for proper nouns).

The Dictionnaire is mentioned in the forty-fifth of the 480 memories recalled by Georges Perec in his Je me souviens (I remember).

== Criticism ==
In the light of the most recent studies, some twenty-first–century authors have highlighted some minor errors and malapproximations in the work of Félix Gaffiot; as, for example, in his treatment of the respective usages of ā (preconsonantal) and ab (prevocalic). The journalist Ugo Rankl also claimed, in an article in Le Point dated March 2001, that the original 1934 edition of the Dictionnaire had been expunged of any term with sexual connotations; however, the briefest of consultations of the 1934 edition finds that many such terms are present in the Dictionnaire, but that they have been given allusive or indirect translations. These were reintroduced in the latest edition of the Dictionnaire by Pierre Flobert.
