= Pyrenean goat =

French goat breed from the Pyrenees

Pyrenean
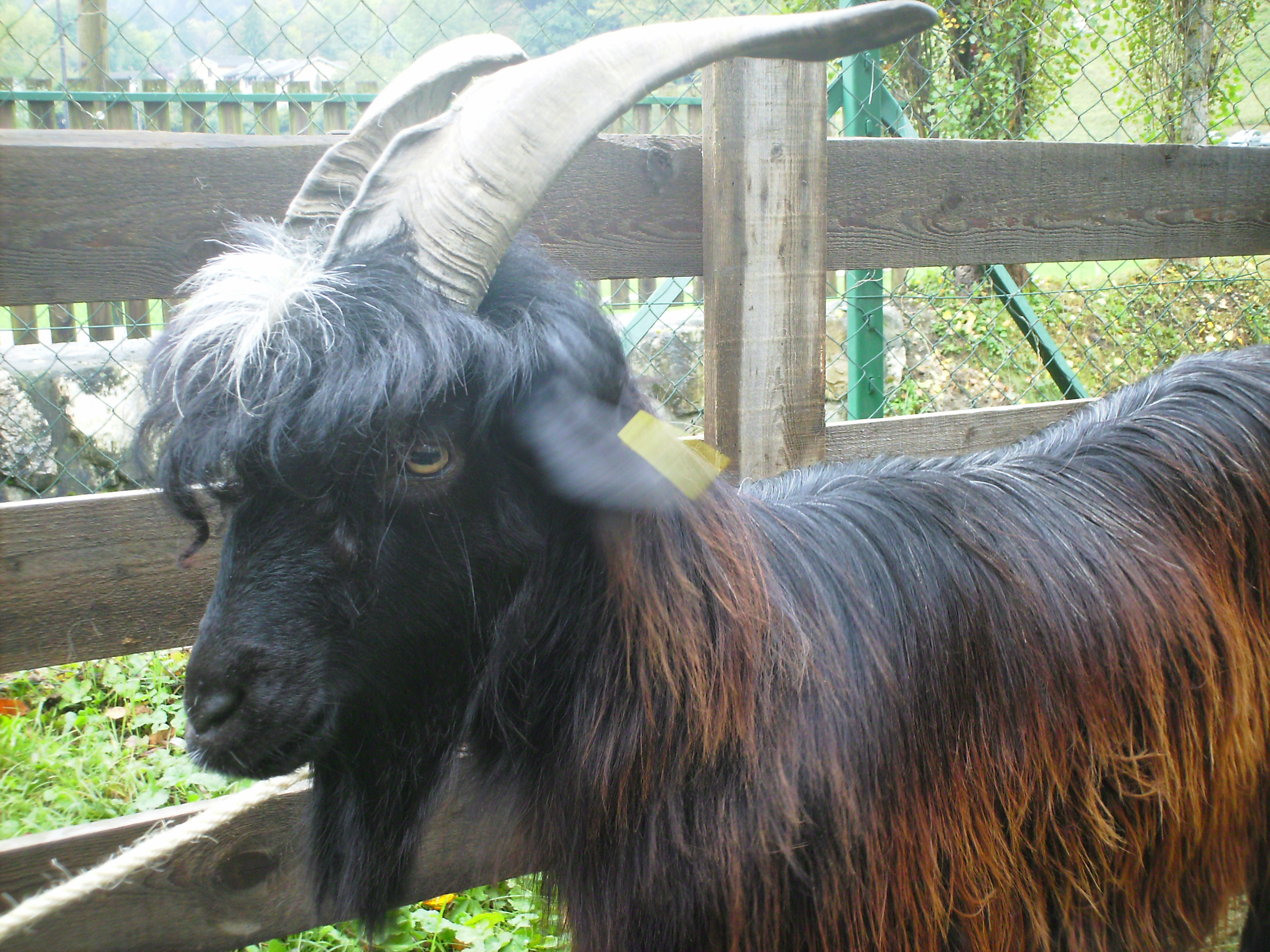
- Country of origin: France
- Use: Milk and meat

Traits
- Coat: Brown or black with white spots
- Horn status: Long, sometimes twisted
- Goat; Capra aegagrus hircus

The Pyrenean goat is a breed of goat native to the Pyrenees in France.

The Pyrenean goat is of medium size, measuring 75 to 85 centimetres (33 in) at the withers and weighing around 50 kilograms (110 lb). It has long hair, typically brown or black, sometimes with white patches. This breed has inhabited the Pyrenees for centuries and was historically associated with cattle and sheep herds, providing milk to shepherds. With the modernization of livestock farming, the breed nearly went extinct in the second half of the 20th century. However, interest in the breed has been revived since the 1990s, and its population has been increasing due to the efforts of regional conservation organizations and, since 2004, the Pyrenean Goat Breed Association, which oversees the breed's preservation program.

Two types of farming systems are observed: suckling systems and dairy systems. Suckling systems produce kids for slaughter, typically around Easter, with kids weighing approximately 15 kilograms (33 lb). Dairy systems milk the goats after early weaning of the kids at two months, using the milk, which has adequate butterfat and protein levels, to produce cheese, such as crottin or Tomme des Pyrénées. The kids are not particularly well-conformed, and milk production per goat is significantly lower than that of specialized breeds. However, the Pyrenean goat is highly rustic, capable of thriving on poor vegetation in harsh climatic conditions. It helps maintain open landscapes by preventing overgrowth.

== History ==
=== Origin and peak of the breed ===
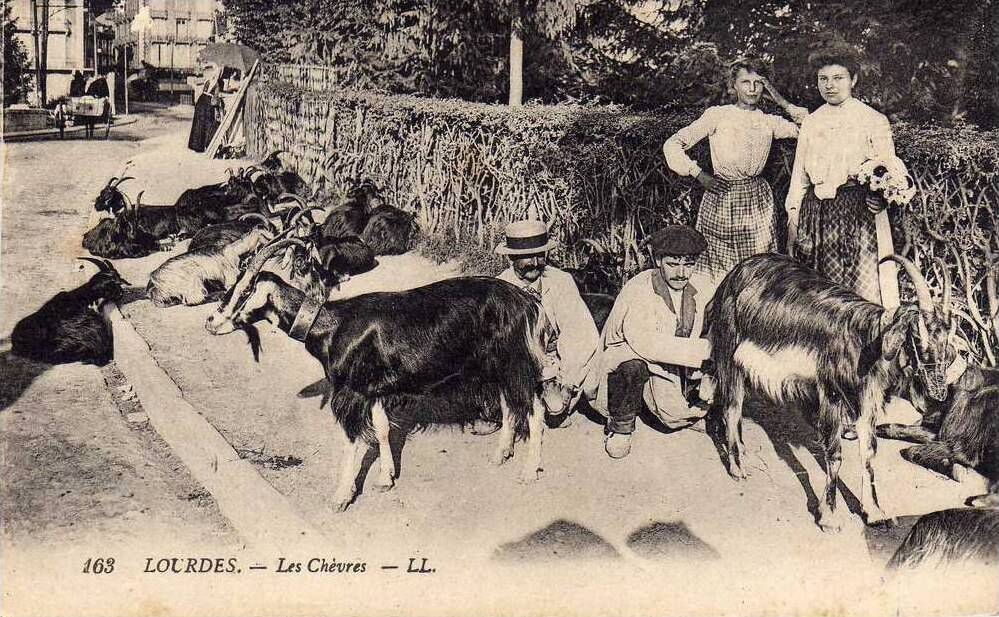
Milk of Pyrenean goats in Lourdes (Hautes-Pyrénées) between the 1870s and 1890s

The Pyrenean goat traditionally populated the entire eponymous mountain range. It appears to be a very ancient breed, with some suggesting it descends from the first domesticated goats in Mesopotamia around 5000 BCE. Its exact arrival in the Pyrenees is unknown. Nevertheless, a relatively heterogeneous goat population has been raised in the Pyrenees for a long time. Traditionally, five or six goats were kept among sheep herds, providing fresh milk for the shepherd and their dog during the long months of transhumance in the mountains.

The milk of the Pyrenean goat also became popular in urban areas, with Béarnais breeders bringing their animals to cities to sell freshly milked milk. This practice began in the 1870s and grew in scope between 1875 and 1880. Goat herders from the western Pyrenees settled in February on vacant lots in Montrouge, south of Paris, with seven to fifteen goats each, grazing them on the embankments of fortifications. Mornings and afternoons, they roamed the streets, calling out to sell milk for 20 to 30 cents per cup. By October or November, they returned home. The practice even spread to London. In June 1882, The Illustrated London News reported eight or nine bands of six to ten Pyrenean goats in the West End, each driven by a Pyrenean goat herder playing a half whistle, half flute instrument. It described the scene as "lending a novel and agreeable feature to our street life". 1900, an estimated 1,500 Pyrenean goats were in the streets of Paris. This activity declined after World War I due to increased traffic, which made street milking impractical, and the rise of refrigeration techniques, which reduced the need for on-site milking. The Béarnais strain was noted for its excellent milk production within the heterogeneous Pyrenean goat population, described as a "first-class dairy goat" by some contemporary authors. Rozier described the Pyrenean goat as "taller and larger than the common [goat]" and a better milk producer.

=== Decline ===
A long period of decline followed. The population, estimated at 70,000 animals in 1852, dropped to 50,000 by 1957. Goats were no longer valued on farms, seen as symbols of outdated, impoverished farming, and criticized for damaging forest plantations. In the second half of the 20th century, the decline accelerated due to rural exodus and competition from more productive breeds like the Alpine and Saanen. The breed, like other local goat breeds, was not recognized by agricultural authorities. When the UPRA caprine was established in the 1970s, it represented the entire species through only three breeds: Alpine, Saanen, and Poitevine. Zootechnicians showed little interest in standardizing or organizing the selection of goat breeds. More productive breeds like Alpine and Saanen quickly surpassed the Pyrenean goat, even in its native region, and local animals were often crossbred with these breeds to improve them.

The population of purebred Pyrenean goats plummeted, and by the late 1980s, the breed was considered nearly extinct. Small, highly heterogeneous herds remained, and the population barely met the definition of a breed due to significant variation, even in coat color—a trait typically standardized first in breed creation. Due to the lack of selection, surviving animals often had traits ill-suited to modern farming, such as long hair hindering mechanical milking, low productivity compared to selected breeds, poor adaptation to stabling, and no health programs to eradicate diseases like brucellosis. Some experts argue that the breed's potential was not inherently limited but was hindered by a lack of organization and support.

=== Recent revival ===
In the early 1990s, the breed was nearly extinct, but renewed interest in local, low-population breeds emerged, some of which had conservation programs since the 1980s. The Pyrenean goat benefited from this trend. Regional conservatories (Midi-Pyrénées Regional Biological Heritage Conservatory and Aquitaine Regional Breeds Conservatory) actively worked to save the breed, cataloging remaining populations. A 1992 preliminary study identified 238 goats in 25 farms, some partially crossbred. In 1993, the population was estimated at 500–600 animals. In 1994, a precise count in the Basque Country recorded 246 goats in 21 farms.

Thanks to efforts by conservatories and the interdepartmental goat union, the population grew. In 1994, 680 purebred goats were recorded, mostly in Aquitaine. Numbers rose to 1,164 in 1995 and 1,803 in 1996. The number of breeders also increased, from 76 to 93 between 1994 and 1996. The breed was reorganized with the establishment of a goat breeding center and a stud farm for bucks. In 2004, a breeders' association was formed, which set a new standard, supported breeders, monitored selective breeding, and promoted the Pyrenean goat. The association manages the breed's studbook and is supported by Capgènes, the goat section of France UPRA Sélection, which aids in the breed's selection program. The Pyrenean goat has been recognized as a low-population breed by the Ministry of Agriculture since the 1990s. By 2009, the population reached 3,025 animals, including 2,800 females.

== Description ==
=== General appearance ===
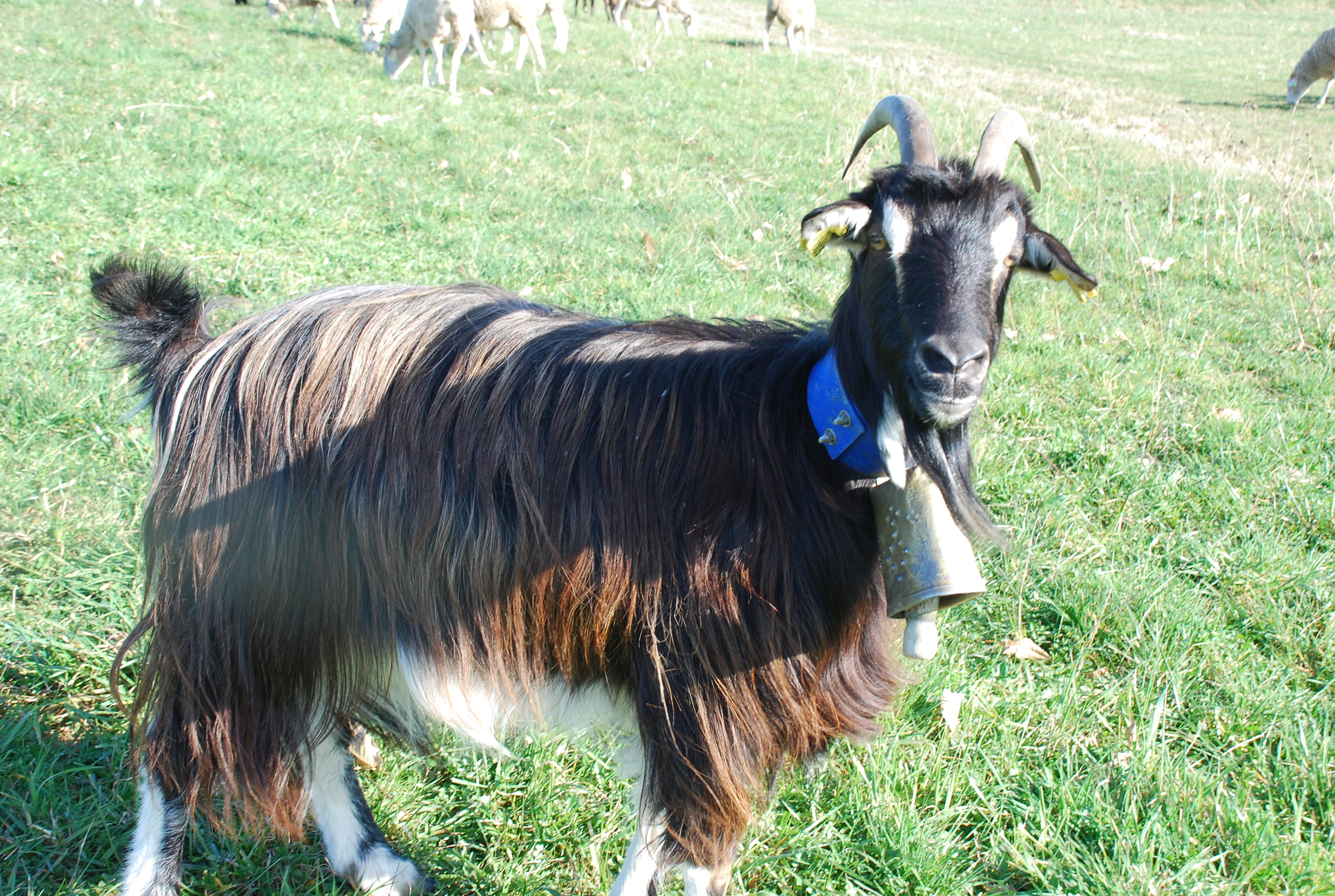
Pyrenean goat.

The Pyrenean goat long lacked a clearly defined standard, resulting in significant heterogeneity. Despite this, certain common characteristics are observed. It is a relatively large goat, with females measuring 75 centimetres (30 in) and males 80 to 90 centimetres (35 in), weighing 55 to 60 kilograms (130 lb) and 90 kilograms (200 lb), respectively. It has a robust bone structure, deep chest, thick, muscular limbs, and strong joints. Its coat is characterized by long or medium-long, shaggy hair. Coat color varies widely, including black, white, gray, brown, or yellow, with intermediate shades and white patches possible. The belly is typically lighter, with brown and black coats being the most common. The head has long, drooping ears and a pair of long, rounded horns that spread outward and backward, sometimes twisted. Some animals are hornless.

=== 2008 Standard ===
In 2008, the breed preservation association established the first standard to homogenize the growing population, though many coat colors remain accepted.

- General appearance: Large size, solid bone structure, medium-long to long coat, overall rusticity;
- Head: Strong and massive; heavy, horizontal to drooping ears; beard in both sexes; straight, backward-leaning, slightly curved, and divergent horns in females, or "corn de boc" horns in some females; developed horns in males (hornless animals accepted);
- Legs: Strong legs; widely spaced hooves;
- Coat: Medium-long to long; stiff hair; frequent frontal fringe (especially in males);
- Coat color: Variable, from black to white (dark brown, dry fern, laurel, chocolate, honey, cream white), solid or multicolored; lighter hair often localized (head, belly, legs); traditional pattern black to dark brown with localized light hair;
- Traits to avoid: Short hair; erect ears; thin legs; black stripe on the back.
Pyrenean Goat Breed Preservation Association, 2008.

=== Coat color patterns ===
The Pyrenean goat displays various recognized coat color patterns.

- Solid pattern: The most common, affecting 47% of the population, typically black or "dry fern" black, with about 6% being entirely white.
- Laurel pattern: Affects 16% of the population, with a black or "dry fern" black back and white underbelly.
- Spotted pattern: 14% of animals have various colors spotted on a white background.
- Zebra pattern: 10% of animals have large colored bands on their body.
- Black collar pattern: 5% of animals have a black patch at the collar, not extending past the shoulder tips.
- Entangled pattern: The rarest, affecting 3% of animals, with mixed colored hairs.

== Aptitudes ==
The Pyrenean goat is a dual-purpose breed used for both dairy and meat production. Two-thirds of farms use it for suckling, while the rest milk the goats. Historically, it also provided high-quality leather: goat hides were used for parchment or leatherworking, kid hides for glove-making and shoemaking, and buck hides for making wineskins to transport wine to Spain. Today, some breeders sell hides for bedspreads, plush toys for children, or percussion instruments.

=== Meat production ===
The breed typically produces two kids per year, raised under the mother for slaughter. They are sometimes supplemented with hay or farm-produced grains but rarely commercial feed. Their meat is highly regarded, especially around Easter, when lightweight kids of about 15 kilograms (33 lb) are marketed. Others are sold in autumn or at Christmas, heavier at 20 to 30 kilograms (66 lb). The age of kids at sale varies, with one-third sold between 2 and 3 months. Some are sold to fatteners for finishing before slaughter. Kids are often sold directly to individuals, leading to irregular prices. While goat meat is less popular today, it was widely consumed in the Pyrenees 50 years ago, and a loyal consumer base remains. Bigorre goat hams were once a highly prized delicacy.

=== Dairy production ===
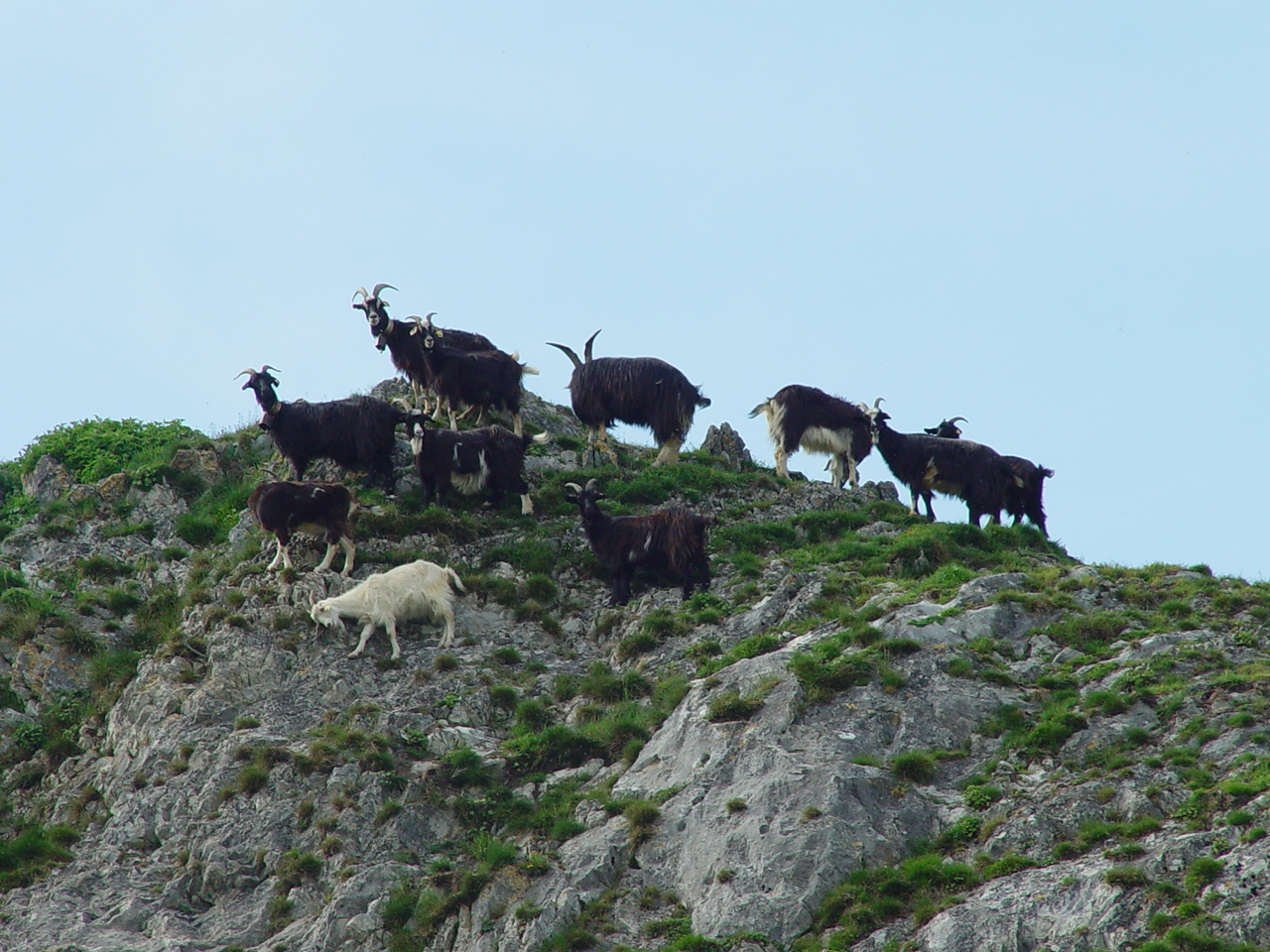
Pyrenean goats on the Pic de la Clique (1,200 metres (3,900 ft)), Germs-sur-l'Oussouet (Canton of Lourdes-Est)

Milk production is modest, ranging from 200 to 400 kilograms (880 lb) per lactation, averaging 315 kilograms (694 lb) over 228 days for animals under performance monitoring. However, the milk has good protein (30.4 grams per kilogram (0.486 oz/lb)) and butterfat (38.5 grams per kilogram (0.616 oz/lb)) levels. Its cheese-making yield is lower due to a genetic trait: the presence of a null allele for casein β, observed by INRA in 1999. Homozygous goats with this allele do not produce casein β, a coagulable protein critical for cheese production. This allele, unique among French goat breeds, is common in Pyrenean goats, present in 80% of farms with an allelic frequency of 0.11. Local practices, such as meat-focused farming or mixing goat and cow milk for cheese, likely prevented selection against this trait.

The milk is primarily used to make small lactic cheeses or Tomme des Pyrénées. The Pyrenean goat tomme is a traditional uncooked pressed cheese, shaped as a cylinder with slightly rounded edges, available in two sizes: a 2.5 kilograms (5.5 lb) tomme, 19 centimetres (7.5 in) in diameter and 8.5 centimetres (3.3 in) high, and a 400 grams (14 oz) tomette, 11 centimetres (4.3 in) in diameter and 5 centimetres (2.0 in) high. This cheese is part of a project to obtain PGI status under the name “Tomme des Pyrénées – Raw Milk Goat Cheese.”

=== Rustic breed ===
The breed is highly rustic, well-suited to the rugged terrain and harsh climate of its native region. It withstands adverse weather and cold, allowing it to live outdoors at high altitudes with limited food resources. The relatively small udder of lactating goats does not hinder their movement on rough terrain. They utilize poor-quality flora, including brambles, nettles, shrubs, and low-nutrient herbs. The breed is ideal for maintaining open landscapes, countering fallow land overgrowth. Its role in clearing brush is well-recognized, though it was restricted from forests in the 19th century to protect timber production. It can consume up to 87% woody plants and only 13% herbaceous plants.

== Farming ==
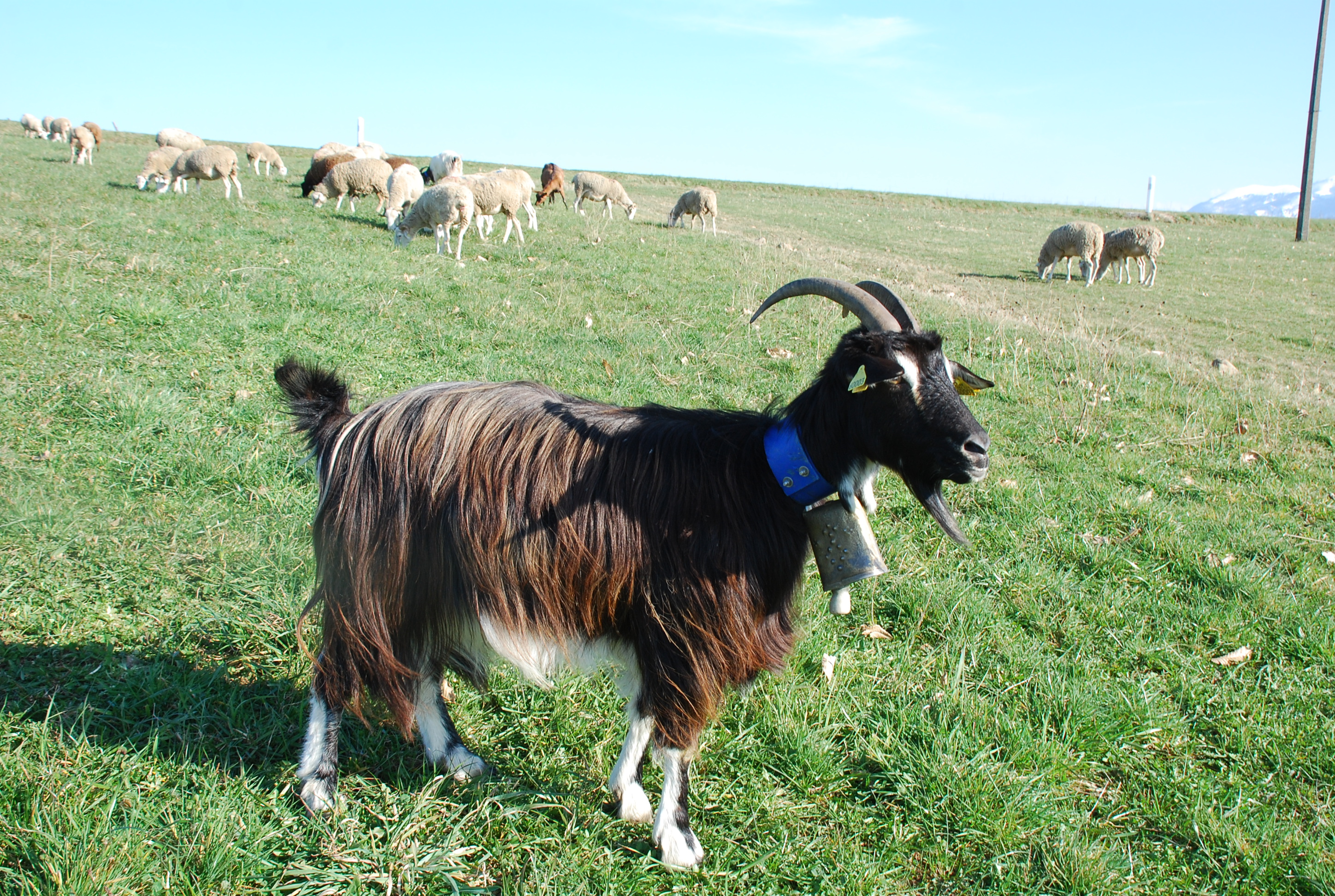
Pyrenean goat in a flock of Tarasconnaise sheepTarasconnaise sheep.

Pyrenean goats are raised in traditional farms in their native region, using cost-effective systems that maximize the use of pastures and wooded pastures. In winter, they are often housed in barns and fed hay. Many breeders focus on suckling systems, marketing kids raised under the mother, with goats spending most of the year outdoors and only housed during parturition. Breeders are often pluriactive, with goats providing supplemental income. Dairy systems produce valued cheeses, with the milk’s high butterfat and protein levels well-suited for cheese-making. Dairy breeders typically begin milking after kids reach 1–2 months, reducing spring workload and allowing kids to benefit from maternal milk for rapid growth.

Farms are typically small, with suckling farms averaging 23 goats and dairy farms 21. Most dairy farms have 11–20 goats, though farms with over 40 goats are common, especially among suckling breeders. Three-quarters of the goats are purebred Pyrenean, with others often crossbred but retaining some Pyrenean blood. Many farms complement goat farming with other activities: a quarter of suckling breeders also raise suckling sheep, a third keep horses or donkeys, and a quarter of dairy breeders milk cows or sheep. Breeders cite preserving local heritage as a key reason for raising Pyrenean goats.

== Conservation ==
The Pyrenean goat has been part of a conservation program since the 1990s, initiated by local conservation organizations. Launched in 1998 by the Midi-Pyrénées Regional Biological Heritage Conservatory, the program was taken over in 2003 by the Midi-Pyrénées Regional Goat Federation. In 2004, the Pyrenean Goat Breed Association assumed responsibility for the program, downstream supply chains, and breed promotion. It is supported by Capgènes, the Institut de l'élevage, the Pyrenees Farmhouse and Artisanal Cheesemakers Association, regional conservatories, and local authorities.

The program aims to increase genetic diversity to avoid inbreeding and improve animal productivity for viable farming. The association promotes a selection program, encouraging suckling breeders to weigh kids and dairy breeders to join simplified milk recording programs introduced in 2010 for low-population breeds. It also funds the rearing of high-quality breeding bucks. Like many low-population breeds, the Pyrenean goat is part of a cryopreservation program for semen and embryos, with 592 semen doses from eight males preserved by 2008. The association conducts sensory studies on Pyrenean goat lactic cheese and kid meat and provides technical-economic monitoring of farms to support new breeders. It also promotes the breed through events and publications.

== Distribution ==
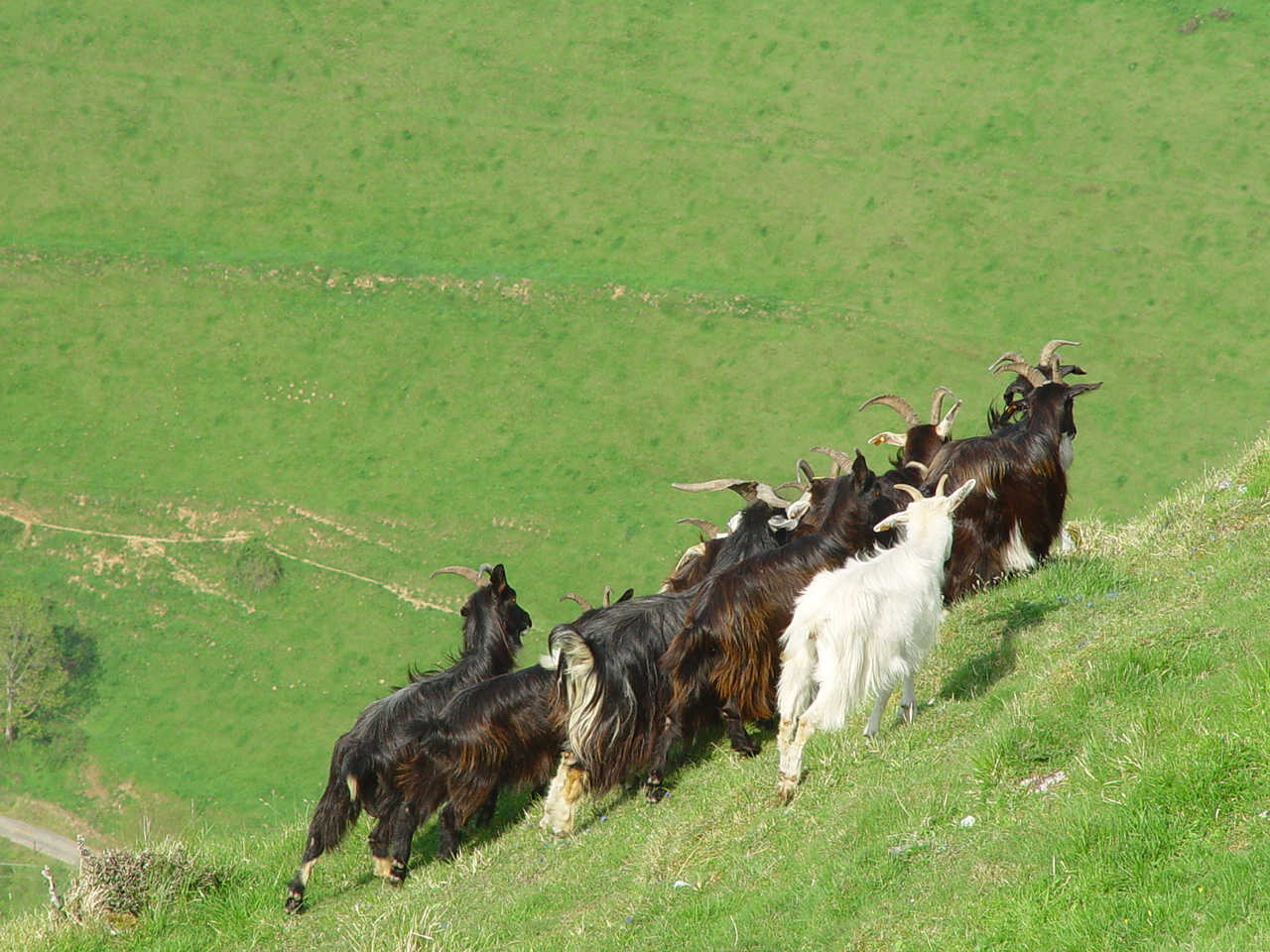
Herd of Pyrenean goats on the slope of Pic de la Clique (1,200 metres (3,900 ft)) in Germs-sur-l'Oussouet (Canton of Lourdes-Est) (Hautes-Pyrénées).

The Pyrenean goat is found across much of the Pyrenees mountain range, spanning the Occitanie and Nouvelle-Aquitaine regions, with a roughly balanced distribution today. Historically, they were primarily in Aquitaine. In the 1852 census, 70,000 goats were recorded, mainly in the Landes and Gironde (37,000 animals), and the Basses-Pyrénées (now Pyrénées-Atlantiques), with 13,000 goats, particularly in the arrondissements of Pau and Oloron-Sainte-Marie. The Hautes-Pyrénées had 8,000 animals, mainly in Argelès-Gazost and Bagnères-de-Bigorre, 3,000 in Haute-Garonne near Saint-Gaudens, and 8,000 in Ariège around Foix and Saint-Girons.

The Pyrénées-Atlantiques now host the majority, with over 1,000 goats, followed by the Hautes-Pyrénées with about 500, and the Pyrénées-Orientales. They are also present in the Aude, Ariège, and Haute-Garonne. About 85% of the population is in the Pyrenees massif, with one-third in a natural park area. The breed is less common in the Landes and Roussillon than before. On the Spanish side, the Pyrenean goat has a cousin, the raza Pirenaica, which populates the southern Pyrenees. The two populations are distinct, though some exchange of breeding animals has occurred in the Pyrénées-Atlantiques and upper Garonne valley.

== The Pyrenean Goat in culture ==
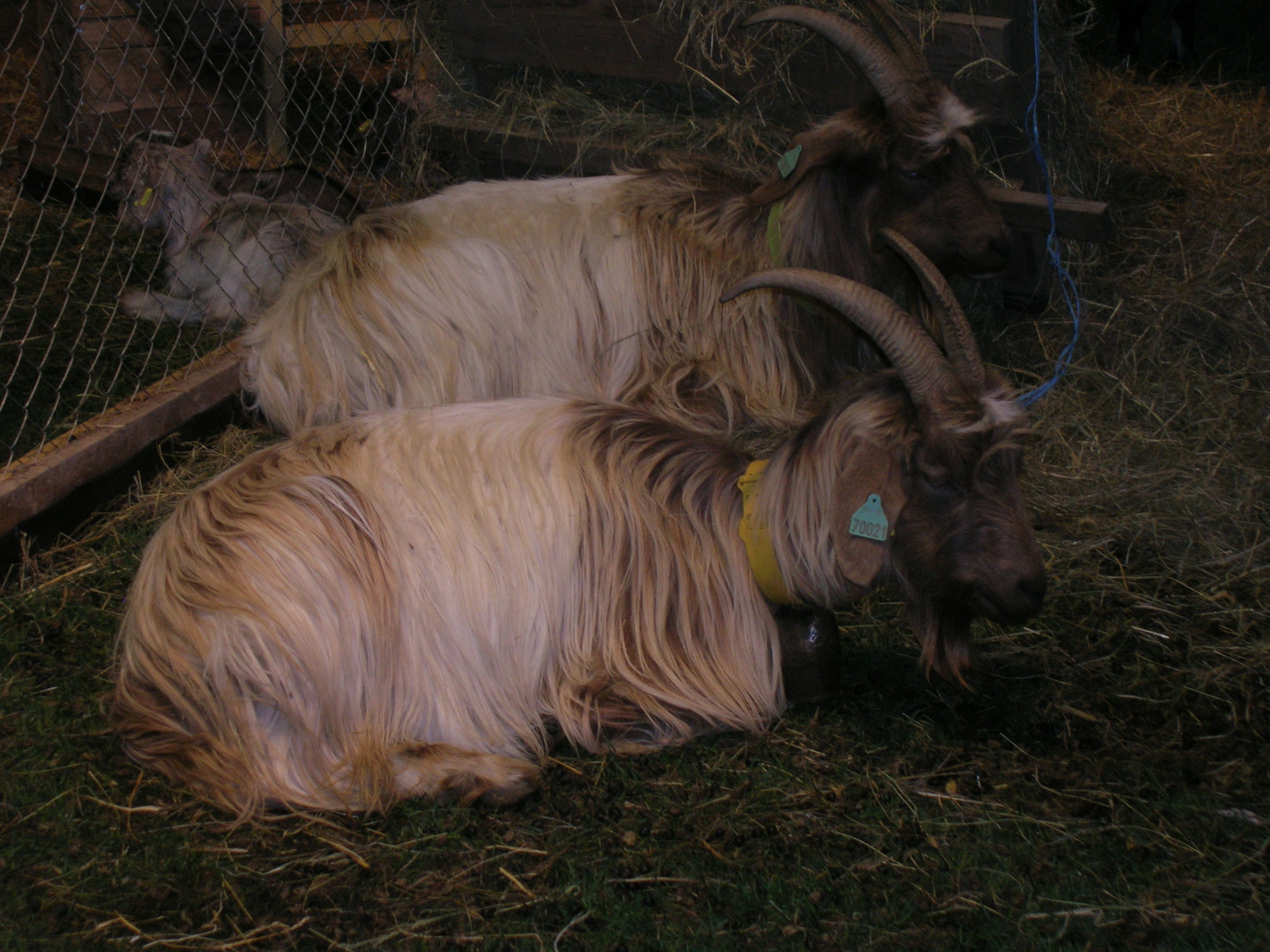
The Pyrenean goat has increasingly appeared at public events, such as the SISQA show in Toulouse.

The goat holds cultural significance in the Pyrenees, reflected in local expressions noted by Simon Palay in his Dictionnaire du béarnais et du gascon modernes. Examples include “Que vau mielher estar crabèr d'Agòs que vecàri de Viscòs” (better to be a goatherd in Agos than a vicar in Viscos), “Un endreit d'escòrna craba” (a place to dehorn a goat, meaning a rugged area), “Quin crabas a, diables qu'a” (who has goats has devils to keep), and “Damb quate crabas e lo porquet, que'm trufi d’eth !” (with four goats and a fat pig, I mock winter). The goat is depicted on the Four Valleys Fountain, inaugurated in 1897 on the initiative of Félicitée Duvigneau. This monumental fountain, created by artists Desca, Escoula, and Mathet, features the valleys of Bagnères, Aure, Argelès, and the Tarbes plain, each represented by a figure and an animal. For the Aure Valley, a nymph holds a buck with Pyrenean goat traits: long hair, lyre-shaped horns, a convex profile, and drooping ears. As the dominant breed in the area at the time, it was a natural model for artist Louis Mathet, known for animal realism. The goat also appears on the coats of arms of several Hautes-Pyrénées communes, such as Chèze, Oueilloux, Sireix, and Agos-Vidalos.

The Pyrenean goat has increasingly appeared at local agricultural events. Since 2005, a breed competition has been held annually at the Sainte-Marie-de-Campan fair. In 2010, the breed debuted at the Paris International Agricultural Show, marking its revival and recognition. It is also featured annually at the International Food Safety and Quality Show (SISQA) in Toulouse. Some animals are displayed at the Écomusée de la Grande Lande in the Landes de Gascogne Regional Natural Park, which hosts an annual local breeds week to highlight the Pyrenean goat. The Pyrenean Goat Association publishes a newsletter, “Craba e caulet” (literally “the goat and the cabbage”), to promote the breed.

The buck Zaghouan, a Pyrenean goat, is the mascot of the 68th African Artillery Regiment in La Valbonne (01360), holding the rank of African Artilleryman.

== See also ==
- Goat
- List of goat breeds
- Livestock farming

== Bibliography ==
- Babo, Daniel (2000). Races ovines et caprines françaises [French Sheep and Goat Breeds] (in French). France Agricole Editions. ISBN 978-2-85557-054-9.
- Fournier, Alain (2006). L'élevage des chèvres [Goat Farming]. Editions Artemis. ISBN 978-2-84416-457-5.
