= Didier Berthet =

French Roman Catholic prelate (1962–2023)

His Excellency Didier Berthet
- Bishop of Saint-Dié
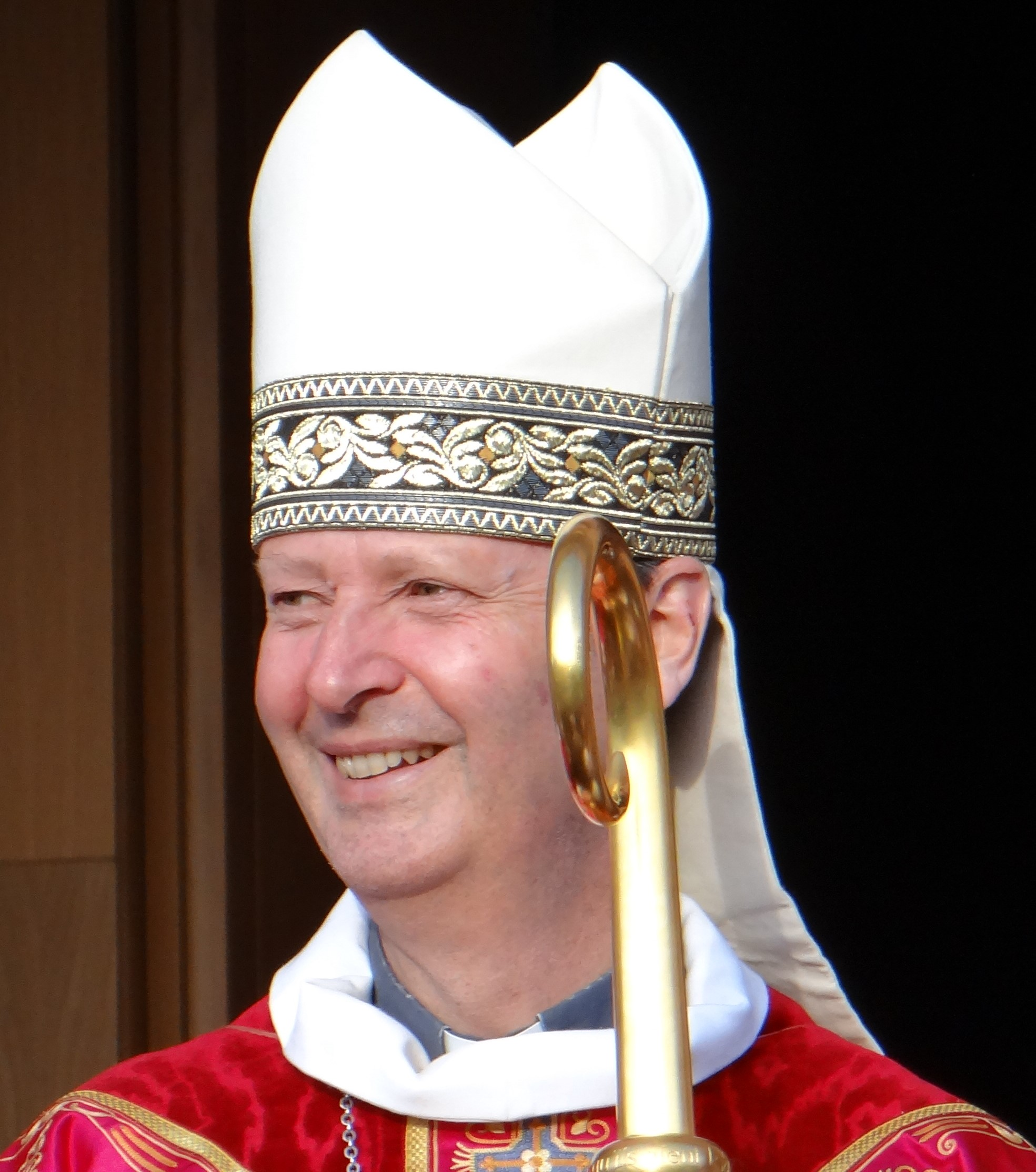
- Berthet in 2019
- Metropolis: Besançon
- Appointed: 15 June 2016
- Term ended: 8 September 2023
- Predecessor: Jean-Paul Mathieu
- Successor: Vacant

Orders
- Ordination: 27 June 1992
- Consecration: 4 September 2016 by Jean-Luc Bouilleret

Personal details
- Born: 11 June 1962 Boulogne-Billancourt, France
- Died: 8 September 2023 (aged 61) Portieux, Vosges, France
- Education: Sciences Po; Pontifical Gregorian University

Didier Berthet (11 June 1962 – 8 September 2023) was a French Roman Catholic prelate who was bishop of Saint-Dié from June 2016 until his death. Raised as a Protestant, Berthet converted to the Catholic Church as a young adult after attending an event when Pope John Paul II was present in France in 1980. He was ordained a priest of the Roman Catholic Diocese of Nanterre in 1992 and in 2016 was named bishop of Saint-Dié.

== Biography ==
=== Conversion and Training ===
Didier Barthet was born in Boulogne-Billancourt, Hauts-de-Seine to a Roman Catholic father and a Calvinist Protestant mother. He was baptized in the Reformed Church of France, receiving a Calvinist education. As a teenager, he attended the Saint Jean Hulst Catholic College in Versailles (1975–1980). At the end of high school, wishing to become a pastor, he reflected on what the Church is and came to the idea that the Catholic Church is apostolic, heir to the faith and succession of the apostles. In 1980, while Pope John Paul II was in France, he took part in a meeting with young people and discovered "the mystery of the Church around [the Pope], as a successor of Saint Peter and his person being the guarantor of a Church that comes from the origins of a universal Church". While studying at Sciences Po (1980–1983), he finally converted to Catholicism in 1983. He then entered the French seminary of Rome (1987–1993) and the Gregorian University of Rome (1987–1993), where he obtained a Bachelor's Degree in Theology (1991) and a Bachelor's degree in Canon Law (1993).

=== Major departments ===
==== Roman Catholic Diocese of Nanterre ====
Ordained priest on 27 June 1992, for the diocese of Nanterre, Father Berthet worked in the cities of Rueil-Malmaison, Antony, Nanterre and Issy-les-Moulineaux.

In Rueil-Malmaison (1993–1998), he was curate of the parish of Saint-Pierre and Saint-Paul, responsible for the chaplaincy of public education, and parish priest of St. Joseph of Buzenval.

In Antony (1998–2006), he was parish priest of Saint-Saturnin (1998–2005); in charge of the accompaniment of seminarians (2001–2003); Episcopal Vicar of the South Sector of Nanterre (2003–2006), Member of the Episcopal Council and parish priest of Sainte-Maxime (2005–2006).

Berthet became chancellor of the diocese of Nanterre, a member of the Episcopal Council and the animator team of the Seminary Saint-Sulpice in Issy-les-Moulineaux (2006-2007), before becoming its superior (2007–2016).

==== Bishop of Saint Die ====
Named bishop of Saint-Dié on 15 June 2016 by Pope Francis, his episcopal consecration took place on 4 September 2016, by the Archbishop of Besancon Jean-Luc Bouilleret, assisted by the Bishop Emeritus of Saint Die Jean-Paul Mathieu (whom he succeeded) and the Bishop of Nanterre Michel Aupetit (his former supervisor). It is also engaged in ecumenical dialogue with the Eastern Orthodox Churches.

=== Death ===
Didier Berthet died of cancer in Portieux on 8 September 2023, at the age of 61.

== See also ==
- Roman Catholic Diocese of Saint-Dié
- List of Bishops in France

Catholic Church titles
Preceded by Jean-Paul Mathieu	Bishop of Saint-Dié; 2016–2023	Succeeded by Vacant
