= André Jean René Lacrampe =

French Catholic archbishop

André Jean René Lacrampe Ist. del Prado
- Archbishop of Besançon
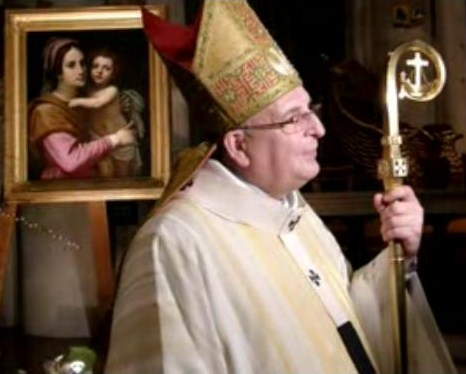
- Church: Catholic Church
- Archdiocese: Archdiocese of Besançon
- In office: 13 August 2003 – 25 April 2013
- Predecessor: Lucien Daloz
- Successor: Jean-Luc Bouilleret
- Previous posts: Bishop of Ajaccio (1995-2003); Prelate of the Mission de France at Pontigny (1988-1995); Titular Bishop of Legia (1983-1988); Auxiliary Bishop of Reims (1983-1988)

Orders
- Ordination: 31 December 1967
- Consecration: 16 October 1983 by Henri Donze

Personal details
- Born: 17 December 1941 Agos-Vidalos, Hautes-Pyrénées, French State
- Died: 15 May 2015 (aged 73)

André Jean René Lacrampe (17 December 1941 – 15 May 2015) was the Roman Catholic Archbishop of Besançon.

He was born on 17 December 1941 in Agos-Vidalos, a commune in the Hautes-Pyrénées department in south-western France. He was ordained as a priest in 1967 for the Prado Institute, an Institute of Consecrated Life. On 16 October 1983 he was ordained the Titular Bishop of Legia and was appointed Auxiliary Bishop of Reims. From 1 October 1988 he was Prelate of Mission de France at Pontigny, France until he became Bishop of Ajaccio on 5 January 1995. He was appointed Archbishop of Besançon on 13 August 2003 and retired from that position on 25 April 2013.

He was made an Officer of the Legion of Honour in 2009, and Chevalier dans l’Ordre des Palmes académiques in 2011. He died in May 2015.
