= Lacrampe =

Lacrampe is a French surname. Notable people with the surname include:

- André Jean René Lacrampe (1941–2015), French Roman Catholic archbishop
- Thierry Lacrampe (born 1988), French rugby union player
