= Jean-Luc Bouilleret =

French Catholic bishop

Monsignor Jean-Luc Bouilleret
- Archbishop of Besançon
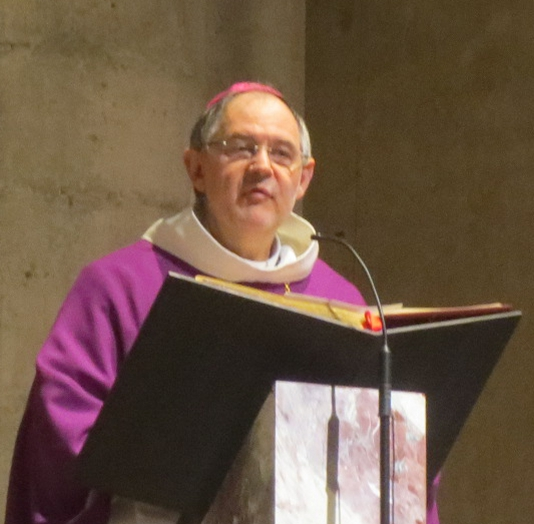
- Bouilleret in 2014
- Church: Catholic Church
- Archdiocese: Besançon
- Appointed: 10 October 2013
- Installed: 17 November 2013
- Predecessor: André Jean René Lacrampe
- Previous post: Bishop of Amiens (2003–2013)

Orders
- Ordination: 28 June 1981
- Consecration: 11 May 2003 by Jacques Noyer

Personal details
- Born: Jean-Luc Marie Maurice Louis Bouilleret; 28 October 1953 (age 73) Arbois, France
- Coat of arms: Jean-Luc Bouilleret's coat of arms

Ordination history
History
Episcopal consecration
- Principal consecrator: Jacques Noyer
- Co-consecrators: Thierry Jordan, Yves Patenôtre
Episcopal succession
Bishops consecrated by Jean-Luc Bouilleret as principal consecrator
- Jean-Paul Gusching: 21 September 2014
- Dominique Blanchet: 12 July 2015
- Didier Berthet: 4 September 2016
- Jean-Luc Garin: 14 February 2021

Jean-Luc Marie Maurice Louis Bouilleret (born 28 October 1953) is a French Roman Catholic prelate who has served as the archbishop of the Roman Catholic Archdiocese of Besançon since 2013.
