= Wenilo =

Wenilo or Wanilo (French Wenilon, Vénilon, Guenelon or Ganelon) may refer to:

- Wenilo (archbishop of Sens), died 865
- Wenilo (archbishop of Rouen), died 869
