= Wenilo (archbishop of Rouen) =

Wenilo (Note: There are many variants of his name in French: Wenilon, Vénilon, Guenelon and Ganelon) (died 18 September 869) was the archbishop of Rouen from 858. He was an appointee of King Charles the Bald.

Wenilo assisted Ragenarius, bishop of Amiens, at a regional synod in Quierzy-sur-Oise in 848. He may have been a cleric in the king's palace prior to his appointment to Rouen in 858. He attended the council at Savonnières in 859, and was one of the judges in the case of treason brought against Wenilo, archbishop of Sens. He also attended the councils held at Aachen in 859 and 861 to deal with the divorce of King Lothair II and Teutberga.

In 860, Wenilo was forced to flee Rouen in the face of Viking attacks and take refuge in Andely, where he owned a property. He was present at the council of Pîtres in 864, where Charles the Bald gave his famous decree concerning the defence of the realm against the Vikings. Archbishop Hincmar of Reims wrote him a letter concerning the construction of a fortified bridge over the Seine at Pîtres.

Wenilo attended the church council at Soissons on 18 August 866. His influence, along with that of Gombert of Évreux and Pardulus of Laon, gained for the abbey of La Croix-Saint-Leufroy in the Drouais many royal gifts before 858. Between 858 and 862 he also got donations for Thiverny in the Beauvaisis so that it could serve as a refuge for monks.

Preceded by Paul	Archbishop of Rouen; 858–869	Succeeded by Adalard
