= Auxiliary bishops of Besançon =

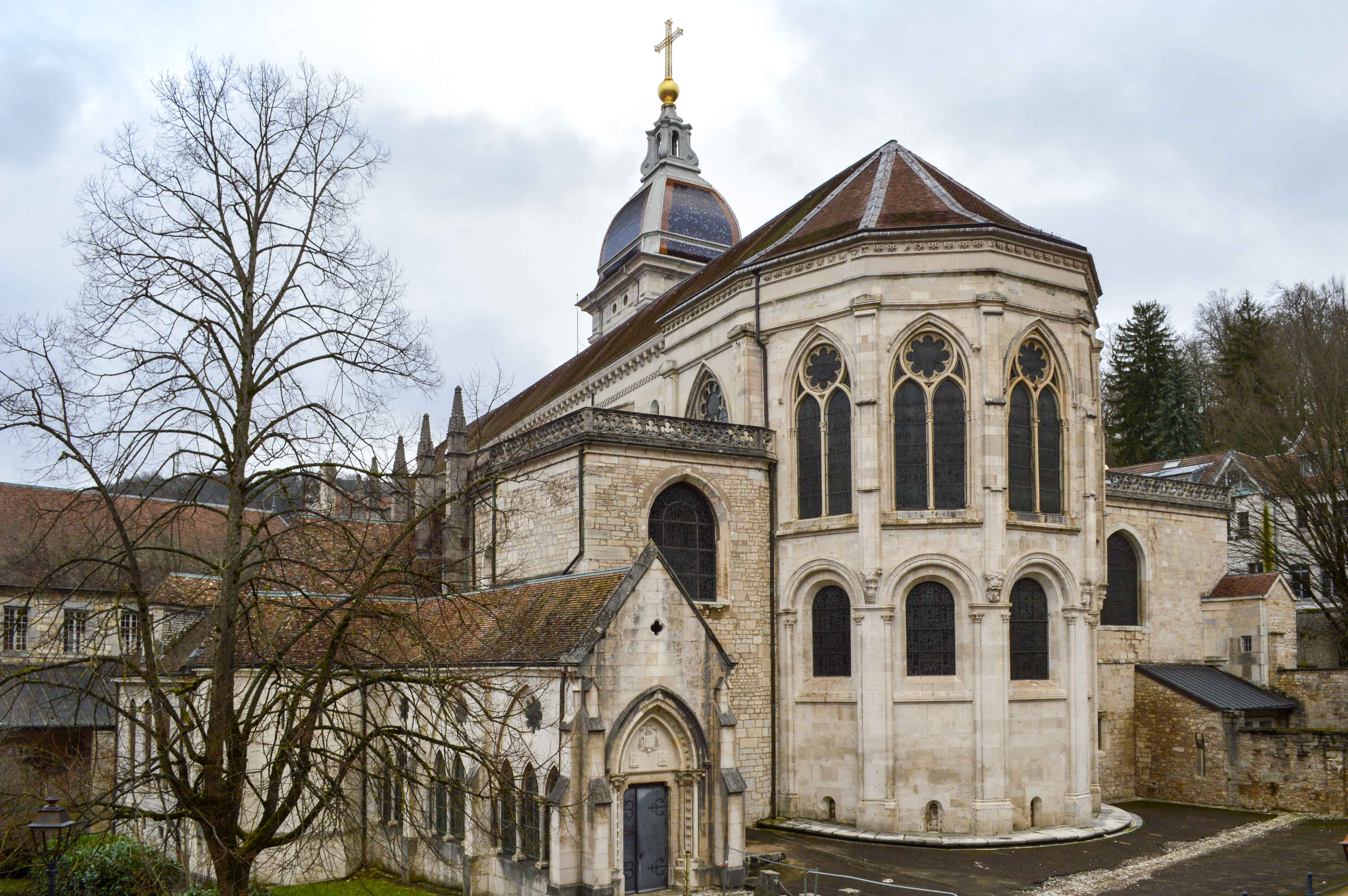
Cathedral of Saint-Jean

This is an annotated list of the auxiliary bishops of the archdiocese of Besanҫon (Doubs, Lorraine, France). The diocese was extremely large. It was diminished somewhat when the diocese of Saint-Claude was created by a bull of Pope Benedict XIV on 22 January 1742. The new diocese was composed of the twenty-six parishes which already belonged to the abbey of Saint-Cloud, to which were added several parishes from the diocese of Besançon, and from the diocese of Lyon.

== Auxiliary bishops ==
...

- (c. 1230–1232) : Henri, O.Cist.
- (c. 1274) : Armand
- (before 1282) Renaud
- (c. 1281–1315) : Thierry de Chariez, O.Cist.
- (1315–1328) Guy de Gy, O.Min.
- (c. 1328) : Hugues
- (c. 1334) : Riquier

...

- (c. 1370) : Clément
- (c. 1410) : Jean

[(c. 1438) : Pierre]

- (1448–1474) : Antoine, O.P.
- (1474–1480) : Philibert Vuillot, O.P.
- (1480–1489) : Henri Potin, O.Carm.
- (1491–1493) : Guy Rosselet, O. Carm.
- (1493–1502) : Odet Tronchet, O.F.M.
- (1502–1514) : Jean Favel, O.P.
- (1514–1523) : Jean Daubert (de Emskerk)
- (1524–1533) : Pierre Tassard, O.P.
- (1533–1554) : François Sinnard
- (1554–1557) : François Richardot
- (1558–1578) : Nicolas Guérin, O.Cist.
- (1579–1584) : Louis de Tartre, O.Cist.
- (1585–1604) : Jean Doroz, O.S.B.Clun.
- (1604–1616) : Guillaume Simonin, O.S.B.
- (1616–1629) : Claude de la Barre, O.F.M.Obs.
- (1631–1639) : Philippe Paternay, O.Minim.
- (1640–1681) : Joseph Saulnier, O.S.B.
- (1686–1699) : François-Joseph de Grammont
- (1707–1727) : François-Gaspard de Grammont
- (1736–1754) : Pierre François Hugon
- (1756–1791) : Claude-François-Ignace de Ran

...

- (1967–1972) : Jean Albert Marie Auguste Bernard
- (1973–1974) : Maurice-Adolphe Gaidon
- (1975–1982) : Jean Cuminal

== See also ==
- Roman Catholic Archdiocese of Besançon (main article)

== Sources ==
=== Reference works ===
- Eubel, Conradus, ed. (1913). Hierarchia catholica, Tomus 1 (second ed.). Münster: Libreria Regensbergiana. (in Latin)
- Eubel, Conradus, ed. (1914). Hierarchia catholica, Tomus 2 (second ed.). Münster: Libreria Regensbergiana. (in Latin)
- Eubel, Conradus; Gulik, Guilelmus, eds. (1923). Hierarchia catholica, Tomus 3 (second ed.). Münster: Libreria Regensbergiana.
- Gauchat, Patritius (Patrice) (1935). Hierarchia catholica IV (1592-1667). Münster: Libraria Regensbergiana.
- Ritzler, Remigius; Sefrin, Pirminus (1952). Hierarchia catholica medii et recentis aevi V (1667-1730). Patavii: Messagero di S. Antonio.
- Ritzler, Remigius; Sefrin, Pirminus (1958). Hierarchia catholica medii et recentis aevi VI (1730-1799). Patavii: Messagero di S. Antonio.
- Ritzler, Remigius; Sefrin, Pirminus (1968). Hierarchia Catholica medii et recentioris aevi sive summorum pontificum, S. R. E. cardinalium, ecclesiarum antistitum series... A pontificatu Pii PP. VII (1800) usque ad pontificatum Gregorii PP. XVI (1846) (in Latin). Vol. VII. Monasterii: Libr. Regensburgiana.
- Ritzler, Remigius; Sefrin, Pirminus (1978). Hierarchia catholica Medii et recentioris aevi... A Pontificatu PII PP. IX (1846) usque ad Pontificatum Leonis PP. XIII (1903) (in Latin). Vol. VIII. Il Messaggero di S. Antonio.
- Pięta, Zenon (2002). Hierarchia catholica medii et recentioris aevi... A pontificatu Pii PP. X (1903) usque ad pontificatum Benedictii PP. XV (1922) (in Latin). Vol. IX. Padua: Messagero di San Antonio. ISBN 978-88-250-1000-8.

=== Studies ===
- Castan, Auguste (1877). Les évêques auxiliaires du siége métropolitain de Besançon. (in French). Besançon: DuDivers 1877.
- Jean, Armand (1891). Les évêques et les archevêques de France depuis 1682 jusqu'à 1801 (in French). Paris: A. Picard. pp. 459–467.
- Loye, Léopold (1902) Histoire de l'Eglise de Besançon. (Besançon: Paul Jacquin). Volume 1 (1901). Volume 2 (1902). Volume 3 (1902). Volume 4 (1902). Volume 5 (1903). Volume 6 (1903)..
- Richard, Jean François Nicolas (1847, 1851). Histoire des diocèses de Besançon et de Saint-Claude. (in French). Besançon: Librairie ecclésiastique de Cornu. Volume 1. Volume 2.
