= François Jacques Bussini =

French Roman Catholic bishop (1936–2018)

François Jacques Bussini (21 May 1936 – 13 October 2018) was a French Roman Catholic bishop.

Bussini was born in Sallanches, France and was ordained to the priesthood in 1965. He served as titular bishop of Febiana and as auxiliary bishop of the Roman Catholic Diocese of Grenoble-Vienne, France, from 1977 to 1985. He then served as bishop of the Roman Catholic Diocese of Amiens, France, from 1985 to 1987.
