= Eulogius =

Eulogius can refer to:

- Saint Eulogius, a deacon martyred with Saint Fructuosus
- Eulogius, an early bishop of Amiens
- Saint Eulogius of Edessa, a bishop of Edessa (late 4th century AD)
- Saint Eulogius of Alexandria (607 AD)
- Saint Eulogius of Córdoba, priest and martyr (859 AD)
- Saint Eulogius of Salosi, Georgia, (Eulogius the Prophet), Fool-for-Christ (12th–13th century), feast April 1
- Eulogius Schneider (1756–1794)
- Eulogius (Georgiyevsky) (1868–1946)
