= Jacques Noyer =

French priest (1927–2020)

- Bishop Emeritus of Amiens
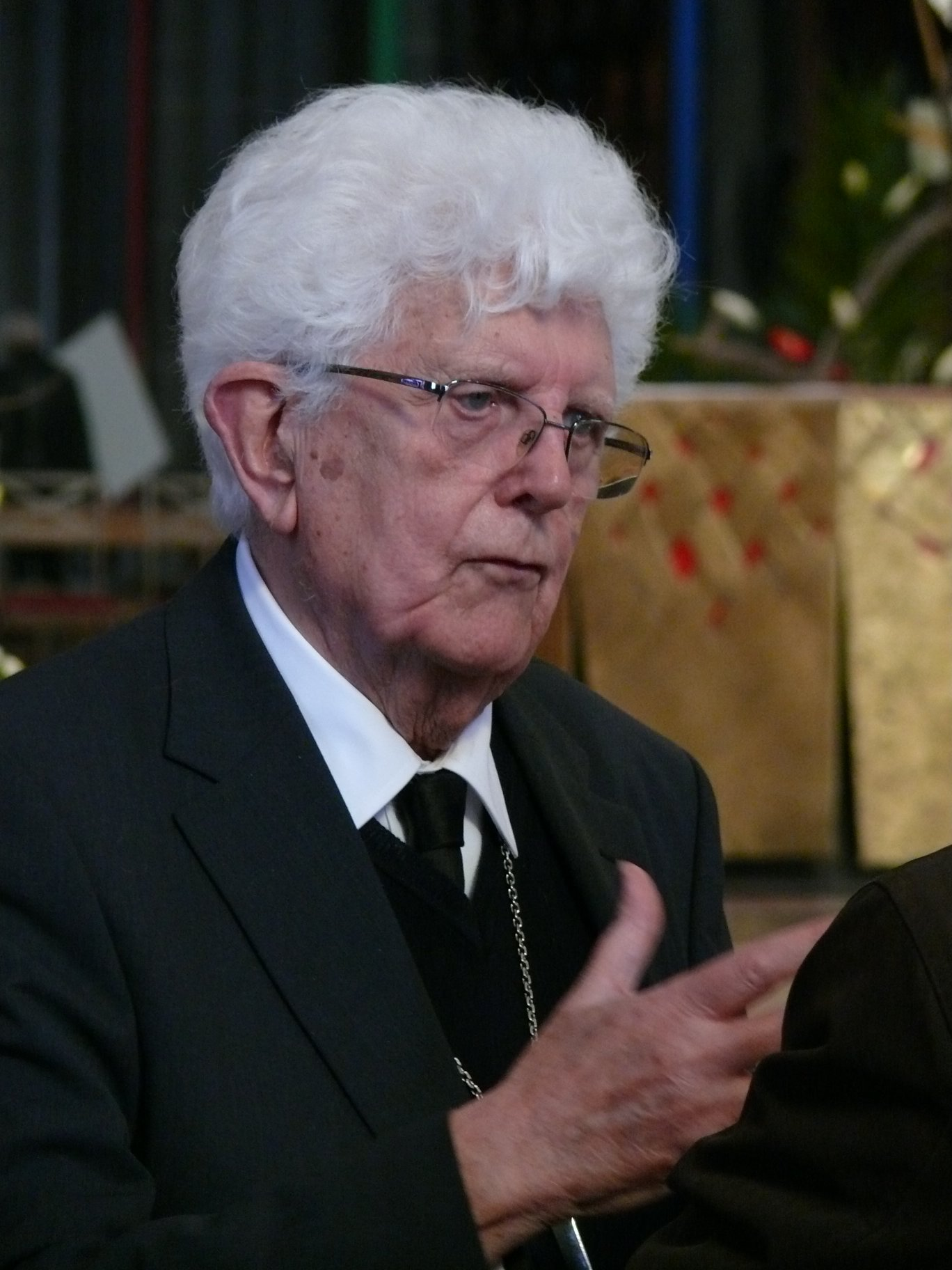
- Jacques Noyer in 2014
- Church: Catholic Church
- See: Diocese of Amiens
- Installed: 31 October 1987
- Term ended: 10 March 2003
- Predecessor: François Bussini
- Successor: Jean-Luc Bouilleret

Orders
- Ordination: 2 July 1950
- Consecration: 13 December 1987

Personal details
- Born: 17 April 1927 Le Touquet, France
- Died: 2 June 2020 (aged 93) Rang-du-Fliers, France
- Education: University of Lille; Pontifical Gregorian University

Jacques Moïse Eugène Noyer (17 April 1927 – 2 June 2020) was a French Roman Catholic prelate. He served as Bishop of Amiens from 31 October 1987 to 10 March 2003.

== Biography ==
Noyer was born on 17 April 1927 in Le Touquet on Rue de Londres. After his secondary studies in Boulogne-sur-Mer, Noyer studied at the University of Lille. He then entered a seminary in Arras before continuing his Catholic training at the Pontifical Gregorian University in Rome, where he earned a degree in scholastic philosophy.

Noyer became a professor at the Collège Haffreingue in Boulogne-sur-Mer in 1952. He left this position in 1963 to teach in Arras, where he stayed until 1970. He was a priest at the St. Joan of Arc Catholic Church in Le Touquet, where he became rector in 1976. Noyer left Le Touquet in 1987, when he was appointed Bishop of Amiens. He stayed at the Amiens Cathedral, and became Bishop Emeritus on 10 March 2003.

== Ideology ==
In 2002, Noyer actively advocated against the election of National Front party nominee for President, Jean-Marie Le Pen, saying that his rhetoric leads to "false security of banter, isolation, racism and xenophobia".

On 23 April 2010, Noyer published an article in Témoignage chrétien, where he examined the difficulty for his contemporaries to accept the idea of the resurrection of Christ. This article raised numerous allegations from religious leaders that Noyer doubted the story of Jesus' resurrection. He addressed these concerns in J. Noyer : « Et maintenant, un évêque incroyant ! » the following month.

Noyer participated in the mass for Jacques Gaillot's 75th birthday on 18 September 2012.

Jacques Noyer died on 2 June 2020 in Le Touquet at the age of 93.

== Works ==
- Quand la télévision donne la parole au public : la médiation de l'information dans l'Hebdo du Médiateur (2009)
- Médias et territoires : l'espace public entre communication et imaginaire territorial (2013)
- Dire Dieu autrement : homélies au fil de l'an (2016)
- À l'ombre du vieux noyer : libres pensées d'un cyber-évêque (2017)

== Awards ==
- Knight of the Legion of Honour (1993)
