= Tomme des Pyrénées =

French cheese

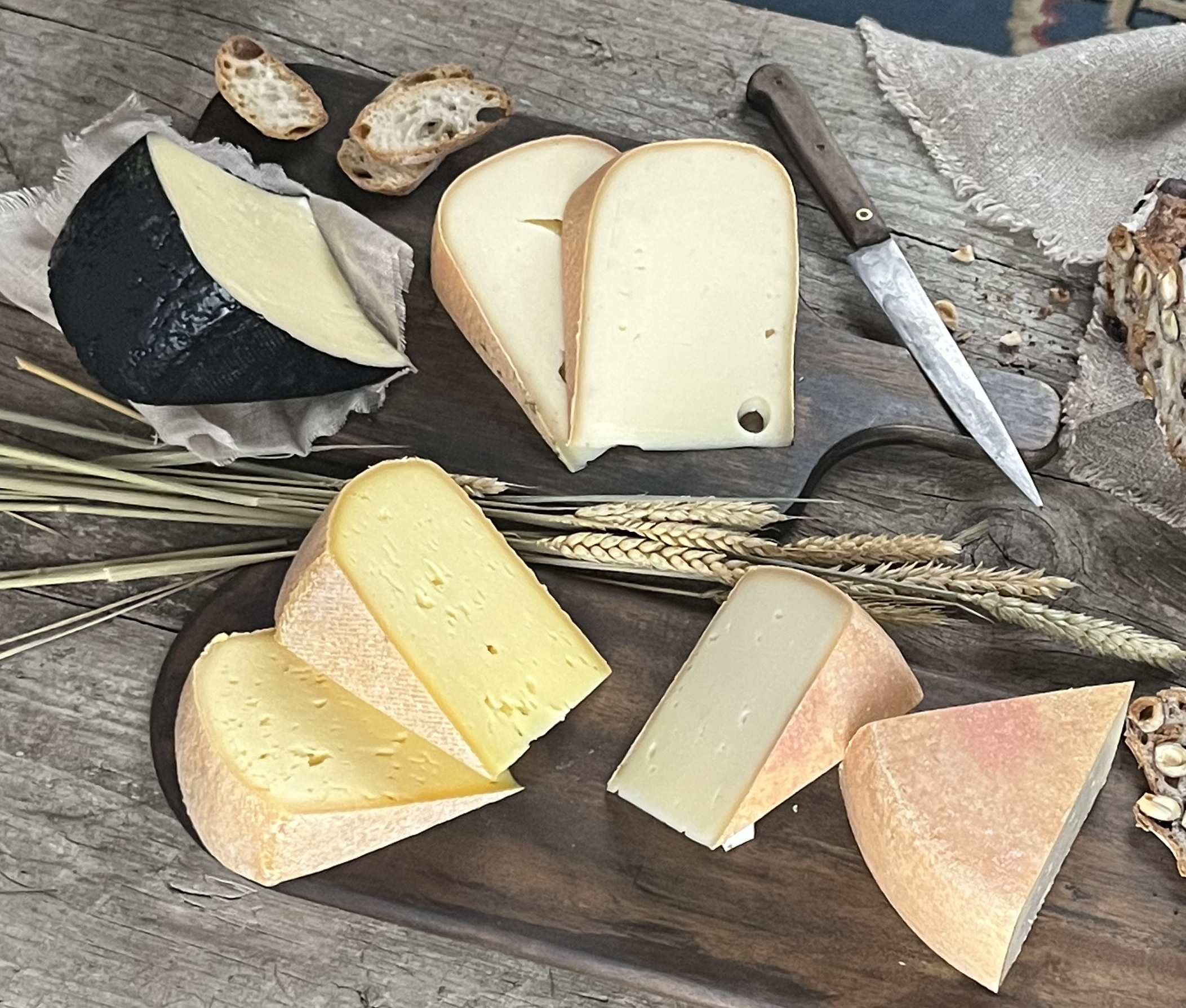
- Different Tomme des Pyrénées cheeses
- Country of origin: France
- Region, town: Aquitaine and Midi-Pyrénées
- Source of milk: Cows, ewes and goats
- Pasteurised: Depends
- Texture: Hard or semi-hard cheese
- Aging time: 3-19 weeks
- Certification: IGP (E.U law no. 1107/96 12 June 1996, PGI (2021)

Tomme des Pyrénées (Occitan: Toma de Pirenèus) is a mild French rustic cheese, sometimes prepared covered with a thin skin of black or brownish wax. In January, 2021, it was ascribed protected geographical indication certification and protection, which links the cheese to its specific geographic origin based upon factors such as quality, reputation or other characteristics.

== History ==
It was once made only by small farmers for their own consumption and could be made from three different kinds of milk: cow, goat and ewe. First mentioned in the 12th century, it was eaten by the nobles of Saint-Girons in Ariège and King Louis VI of France also knew the cheese of the Pyrenees. It was only in the 19th century that the manufacture of the cheese moved to a more professional basis, though still hand-crafted.

== Manufacture ==
A pressed cheese, nowadays made equally from raw or pasteurized cows’ milk. Curdled milk is tossed, cut and put in large moulds. It is drained for 24 hours, then salted and aged in cool, humid cellars, where it is turned by hand every day. An aging period of 21 days minimum is permitted for the black-crusted tomme and 45 days minimum for the gold-covered version. The cheese is sometimes covered with wax, such as seal of paraffin wax.

Tomme des Pyrenees is sold in various sizes, with a cylindrical shape and rounded edges. The small tomme is between 450 g and 1.5 kg (corresponding to the old 1 to 3 livres (pounds) measures) up to 5.5 kg (12 lb). The texture is supple and the taste is creamy and only slightly salty. The colour is normally ivory white, varying to pale yellows. Tomme des Pyrenees is made and aged entirely within the same place as the milk is produced, by local workshops.

== Production totals ==
An annual production of:

- 2,500 tons of cheese made from pasteurized milk by 350 dairy breeders.
- 2,500 tons made from raw milk from 450 farms.

== Production areas ==
- In the Aquitaine region: the Pyrénées-Atlantiques department.
- In the Midi-Pyrénées region: the departments of Ariège and Hautes-Pyrénées and the communes of Saint-Gaudens, Axat and Belcaire.

== See also ==
- List of cheeses
