= Ragenar =

Ragenar (Latin Ragenarius, French Ragenaire or Réginaire) was the bishop of Amiens from 830 to 833 and again from 834 until his death in 849. His predecessor, Jesse, was initially deposed by the Emperor Louis the Pious in 830 for conspiring with his rebellious son Lothair. In 833 he was restored when Lothair forced his father to make public obeisance at an assembly in Soissons. When Louis regained his position in 834, Jesse was again deposed and this time exiled to Italy, where he died in 836.

Ragenar signed a charter of Archbishop Aldric of Sens giving a privilege to the abbey of Saint-Remy in the diocese of Sens. He was present at the Synod of Thionville in 835, where Archbishop Ebbo of Reims, who with Lothair had restored Jesse to Amiens in 833, was deposed. In 840, after the Emperor Louis's death, he attended the synod at Worms where Ebbo was restored.

Ragenar, at the head of a small force raised from the temporalities of his diocese, was part of the army which was on its way south to Toulouse to join King Charles the Bald when it was ambushed by King Pippin II of Aquitaine in the Angoumois on 14 June 844. Ragenar was among the captives while the king's uncle, Hugh, was among the dead. Ragenar remained a prisoner until May 845. That year he managed to attend the synod of Beauvais where Hincmar was chosen to succeed Ebbo.

Ragenar attended the regional synod in Quierzy-sur-Oise, held before Easter (14 April) 849, where the doctrine of Gottschalk of Orbais was condemned. He died later that year, possibly in June. No acts of Ragenar's have been preserved in the meagre first millennium archives of Amiens. He was succeeded by Hilmerad. Some 19th-century scholars placed a second Ragenar after Hilmerad, but this was based on confusion.

== Sources ==
- Beck, Henry G. J. (1959). "The Selection of Bishops Suffragan to Hincmar of Rheims, 845–882". The Catholic Historical Review. 45 (3): 273–308.
- Nelson, J. L., ed. (1991). The Annals of St-Bertin. Manchester: Manchester University Press.
- Nelson, J. L. (1992). Charles the Bald. London: Longman.
- Noble, Thomas F. X., ed. (2009). Charlemagne and Louis the Pious: Lives by Einhard, Notker, Ermoldus, Thegan and the Astronomer. Pennsylvania State University Press.
- Soyez, Edmond (1878). Notices sur les évêques d'Amiens. Amiens: Langlois.
- Wood, Susan (2006). The Proprietary Church in the Medieval West. Oxford: Oxford University Press.
