= Diocese of Amiens =

Catholic diocese in France

Coordinates: 49.8942°N 2.30189°E

Diocese of Amiens Dioecesis Ambianensis Diocèse d'Amiens Diochèse d'Anmiens

Catholic
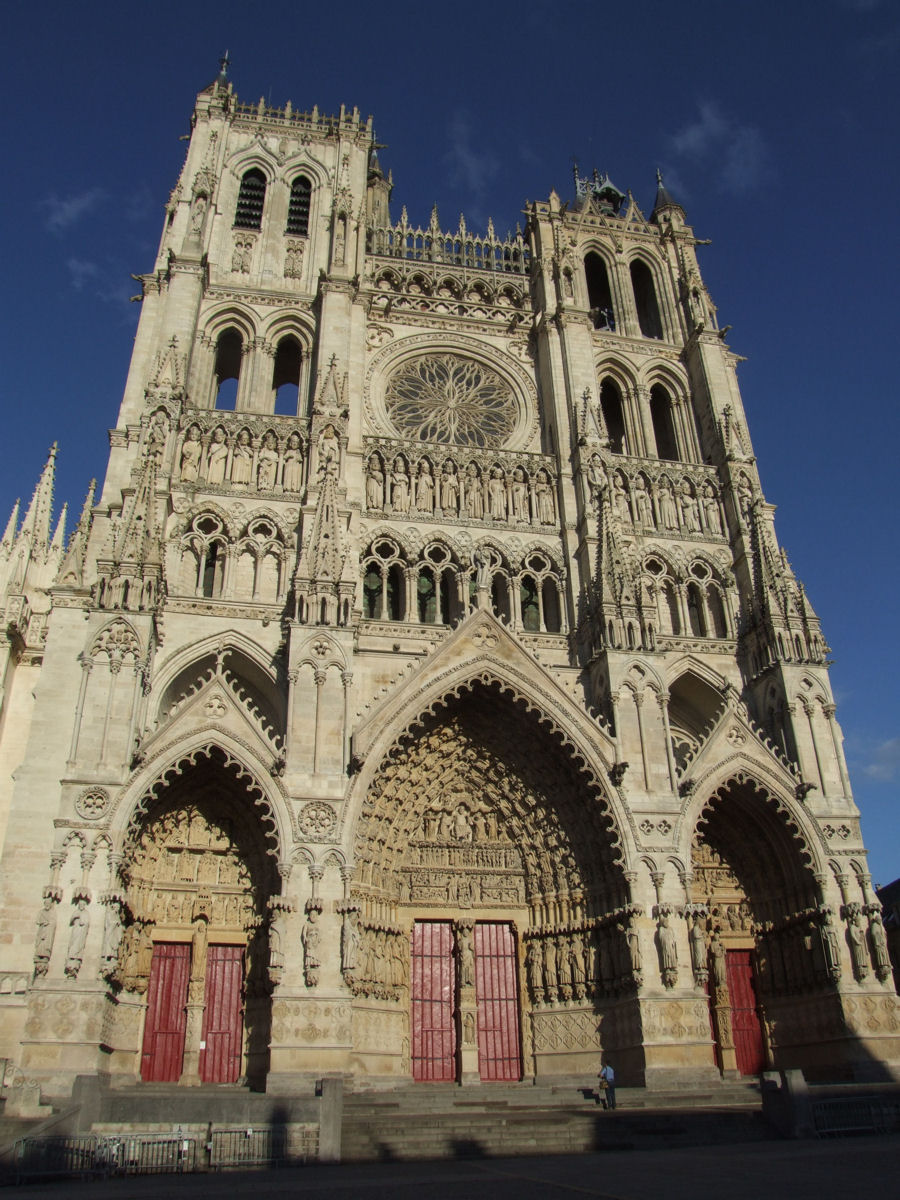
- Amiens Cathedral

Location
- Country: France
- Ecclesiastical province: Reims
- Metropolitan: Archdiocese of Reims

Statistics
- Area: 6,277 km^{2} (2,424 sq mi)
- Population: Total; Catholics: (as of 2022); 569,662; 498,000 (est.) (87.4%)
- Parishes: 49

Information
- Denomination: Roman Catholic
- Sui iuris church: Latin Church
- Rite: Roman Rite
- Established: 3rd Century
- Cathedral: Cathedral Basilica of Notre Dame in Amiens
- Patron saint: St. Fermin of Amiens
- Secular priests: 63 (Diocesan); 9 (Religious Orders); 16 Permanent Deacons

Current leadership
- Pope: Leo XIV
- Bishop: Gérard Le Stang
- Metropolitan Archbishop: Éric de Moulins-Beaufort

Map

Website
- Website of the Diocese

The Diocese of Amiens (Latin: Dioecesis Ambianensis; French: Diocèse d'Amiens) is a Latin Church diocese of the Catholic Church in France. The diocese comprises the department of Somme, of which the city of Amiens is the capital. In 2022 it was estimated that there was one priest for every 6,916 Catholics in the diocese.

== History ==
The diocese of Amiens was a suffragan of the Archdiocese of Reims during the old regime; it was made subordinate to the diocese of Paris under the Concordat of 1801, from 1802 to 1822; and then in 1822 it became a suffragan of Reims again.

Louis Duchesne denies any value to the legend of two Saints Firmin, honoured on the first and twenty-fifth of September, as the first and third Bishops of Amiens. The legend is of the 8th century and incoherent. Regardless of whether a St. Firmin, native of Pamplona, was martyred during the Diocletianic Persecution, it is certain that the first bishop known to history is St. Eulogius, who defended the divinity of Christ in the councils held during the middle of the 4th century.

== Cathedral and churches ==
The cathedral (13th century) is a Gothic building. It was the subject of careful study by John Ruskin in his Bible of Amiens. The nave of this cathedral is considered a type of the ideal Gothic.

=== Cathedral Chapter ===
The Cathedral of Notre Dame d'Amiens was served by a Chapter composed of eight dignities and forty-six Canons. The dignities were: the Dean, the Provost, the Chancellor, the Archdeacon of Amiens, the Archdeacon of Ponthieu, the Cantor, the Master of the Schola, and the Penitentiary. The Dean was elected by the Chapter.

=== Churches ===
The city of Amiens also had a Collegiate Church of Saint-Firmin, whose Chapter was composed of a Dean and six prebendaries. All were elected by the Chapter and installed by the bishop. Saint-Nicolas-au-Cloître d'Amiens also had a Chapter, composed of a Dean and eight prebendaries, all elected by the Chapter and installed by the bishop.

The church of St. Acheul, near Amiens, and formerly its cathedral, was, in the 19th century, the home of Jesuit novitiate. The churches of St. Ricquier and Corbie perpetuate the memory of the great Benedictine abbeys and homes of learning founded in these places in 570 and 662.

In 859 the Normans invaded the valley of the Somme, and sacked the abbey of Saint-Riquier. They pillaged Amiens and held it for more than a year, until the city was ransomed by Charles the Bald.

== Bishops ==
There is a medieval list of the Bishops of Amiens, but it first appears in the work of Robert of Torigni in the second half of the 12th century, and its names before the 8th century are very uncertain.

=== to 1000 ===
[c. 300: Firminus,] first bishop, and martyr

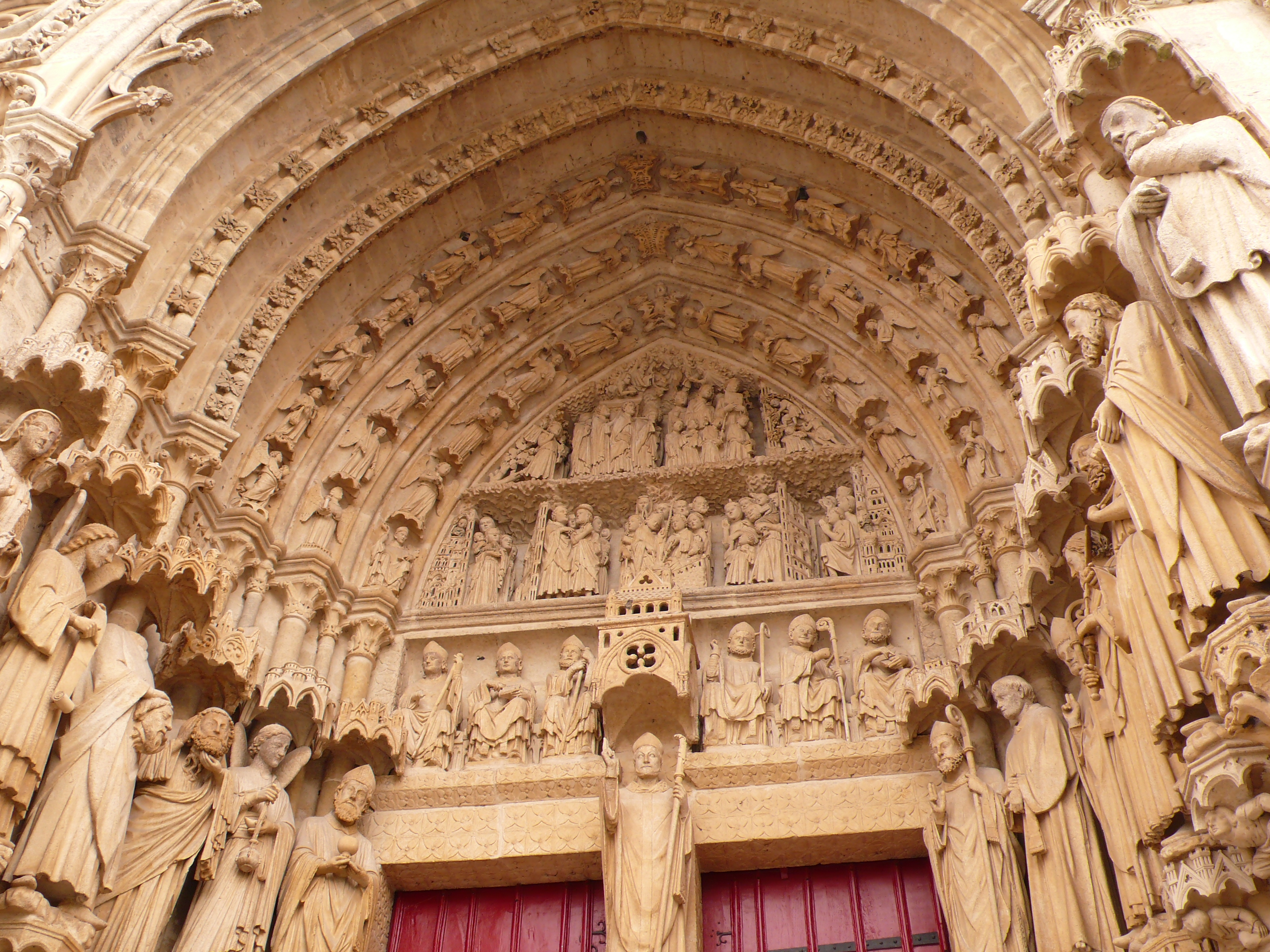
Amiens Cathedral, portal of Saint Fermin

[4th century: Firminus the Younger,] second bishop, and confessor

- c. 346: Eulogius
- 5th century: Leodardus
- circa 450: Audoenus
- c. 511: Edibius
- c. 549: Beatus

[c. 554: Honoratus]
[circa 600: Salvius]

- c. 614: Berachundus
- c. 650: Bertofredus
- [circa 670: Thodefridus]
- 7th century: Deodatus
- 7th century: Dado
- c. 692–c. 697: Ursinianus
- [c. 721: Dominicus]
- before 728 – 746: Christianus
- c. 748–768: Raimbertus
- c. 777?: Vitultus
- c. 769–798/799: Georgius
- c. 799–831: Jesse
- 830–833, 834–849: Ragenar
- 849–872: Hilmerad
- c. 875: Geroldus
- c. 892–928: Otgarius
- c. 929–947: Deroldus

[947: Thibault] (Intrusus)

- from c. 949: Ragembaldus

[972–975: Thibaud] (again)

- c. 975–980: Almannus
- c. 980–992: Gotesmannus
- c. 993–c. 1030: Fulco

=== 1000 to 1300 ===
- c. 1032–1058: Fulco
- 1058–1074: Gui de Ponthieu
- [1076 Fulco]
- 1078–1079: Raoul
- 1080–1085: Roric
- 1091–1101: Gervin

1101–1104: Sede vacante

- 1104–1115: Godfrey of Amiens
- 1116–1127: Enguerrand de Boves
- 1127–1144: Guérin de Chastillon-Saint-Pol
- 1144–1164: Theoderic (Dietrich)
- circa 1164–1169: Robert I.
- 1169–1204: Thibaud d'Heilly
- circa 1204–1210: Richard de Gerberoy
- circa 1211–1222: Evrard de Fouilloy
- circa 1222–1236: Geoffroy d'Eu
- 1236–1247: Arnold
- 1247–1257: Gérard de Conchy
- 1258–1259: Aleaume de Neuilly
- 1259–1278: Bernard d'Abbeville
- 1278–1308: Guillaume de Mâcon

=== 1300 to 1500 ===
- 1308–1321: Robert de Fouilloy
- 1321–1325: Simon de Goucans
- 1326–1373: Jean de Cherchemont
- 1373–1375: Jean de la Grange (Cardinal)
- 1376–1388: Jean Rolland
- 1389–1410: Jean de Boissy (Avignon Obedience)
- 1411–1413: Bernard de Chevenon
- 1413–1418: Philibert de Saulx
- 1418–1433: Jean d'Harcourt
- 1433–1436: Jean Le Jeune
- 1436–1437: Francesco Condulmer (Administrator)
- 1437–1456: Jean Avantage
- 1457–1473: Ferry de Beauvoir
- 1473–1476: Jean de Gaucourt
- 1476–1478: Louis de Gaucourt
- 1482–1501: Pierre Versé

=== 1500 to 1800 ===
- 1501–1503: Philip of Cleves
- 1503–1538: François de Hallvyn
- 1538–1540: Cardinal Charles Hémard de Denonville
- 1540–1546: Cardinal Claude de Longwy de Givry (Administrator)
- 1546–1552: François de Pisseleu
- 1552–1562: Nicolas de Pellevé
- 1564–1574: Antoine de Créqui
- 1574–1577: vacant
- 1577–1617: Geoffroy de La Marthonie
- 1617–1652: François Lefèvre de Caumartin
- 1653–1687: François Faure
- [1687]–1706: Henri Feydeau de Brou
- 1707–1733: Pierre de Sabatier
- 1734–1774: Louis-François-Gabriel d'Orléans de La Motte
- 1774–1791: Louis-Charles de Machault
- 1791–1801: Eléonore-Marie Desbois (Constitutional Bishop of Somme)

=== From 1800 ===
- Jean-Chrysostome de Villaret (9 April 1802 – 17 December 1804)
- Jean-François de Mandolx (17 December 1804 – 14 August 1817)
- Marc Marie, Marquis de Bombelles (23 August 1819 – 5 March 1822 Died)
- Jean-Pierre de Gallien de Chabons (27 Mar 1822 Appointed – 9 November 1837)
- Jean-Marie Mioland (12 February 1838 – 2 April 1849)
- Louis-Antoine de Salinis (2 April 1849 – 12 February 1856)
- Jacques-Antoine-Claude-Marie Boudinet (16 June 1856 – 1 April 1873)
- Louis-Désiré-César Bataille (19 June 1873 – 9 June 1879)
- Aimé-Victor-François Guilbert (2 September 1879 – 9 July 1883)
- Pierre Henri Lamazou (3 July 1883 – 10 July 1883)
- Jean-Baptiste-Marie-Simon Jacquenet (27 March 1884 – 1 March 1892)
- René-François Renou (19 January 1893 – 30 May 1896)
- Jean-Marie-Léon Dizien (25 June 1896 – 27 March 1915)
- Pierre-Florent-André du Bois de la Villerabel (1 Jun 1915 Appointed – 16 Dec 1920 Appointed, Archbishop of Rouen)
- Charles-Albert-Joseph Lecomte (10 Mar 1921 Appointed – 17 Aug 1934 Died)
- Lucien-Louis-Claude Martin (29 May 1935 Appointed – 26 Dec 1945 Died)
- Albert-Paul Droulers (17 Feb 1947 Appointed – 3 Jun 1950 Died)
- René-Louis-Marie Stourm (19 Jan 1951 Appointed – 27 Oct 1962 Appointed, Archbishop of Sens)
- Géry-Jacques-Charles Leuliet (14 Feb 1963 Appointed – 15 Jan 1985 Retired)
- François Jacques Bussini (28 Dec 1985 Appointed – 6 Mar 1987 Resigned)
- Jacques Moïse Eugène Noyer (31 Oct 1987 Appointed – 10 Mar 2003 Retired)
- Jean-Luc Marie Maurice Louis Bouilleret (10 Mar 2003 – 10 Oct 2013 Appointed Archbishop of Besançon)
- Olivier Leborgne (20 Feb 2014 Appointed – 4 Sep 2020 Appointed, Bishop of Arras)
- Gérard Le Stang (20 Mar 2021 Appointed – present)

== See also ==
- Catholic Church in France
- List of Catholic dioceses in France

== Sources ==
=== Reference works ===
- Gams, Pius Bonifatius (1873). Series episcoporum Ecclesiae catholicae: quotquot innotuerunt a beato Petro apostolo. Ratisbon: Typis et Sumptibus Georgii Josephi Manz. (Use with caution; obsolete)
- Eubel, Conradus, ed. (1913). Hierarchia catholica, Tomus 1 (second ed.). Münster: Libreria Regensbergiana. (in Latin)
- Eubel, Conradus, ed. (1914). Hierarchia catholica, Tomus 2 (second ed.). Münster: Libreria Regensbergiana. (in Latin)
- Gulik, Guilelmus (1923). Eubel, Conradus (ed.). Hierarchia catholica, Tomus 3 (second ed.). Münster: Libreria Regensbergiana.
- Gauchat, Patritius (Patrice) (1935). Hierarchia catholica IV (1592-1667). Münster: Libraria Regensbergiana.
- Ritzler, Remigius; Sefrin, Pirminus (1952). Hierarchia catholica medii et recentis aevi V (1667-1730). Patavii: Messagero di S. Antonio.
- Ritzler, Remigius; Sefrin, Pirminus (1958). Hierarchia catholica medii et recentis aevi VI (1730-1799). Patavii: Messagero di S. Antonio.
- Ritzler, Remigius; Sefrin, Pirminus (1968). Hierarchia Catholica medii et recentioris aevi sive summorum pontificum, S. R. E. cardinalium, ecclesiarum antistitum series... A pontificatu Pii PP. VII (1800) usque ad pontificatum Gregorii PP. XVI (1846) (in Latin). Vol. VII. Monasterii: Libr. Regensburgiana.
- Remigius Ritzler; Pirminus Sefrin (1978). Hierarchia catholica Medii et recentioris aevi... A Pontificatu PII PP. IX (1846) usque ad Pontificatum Leonis PP. XIII (1903) (in Latin). Vol. VIII. Il Messaggero di S. Antonio.
- Pięta, Zenon (2002). Hierarchia catholica medii et recentioris aevi... A pontificatu Pii PP. X (1903) usque ad pontificatum Benedictii PP. XV (1922) (in Latin). Vol. IX. Padua: Messagero di San Antonio. ISBN 978-88-250-1000-8.
- Pouillé général, contenant les bénéfices appartenans à la nomination au collaboration du Roy: Archevesche de Reims (in French). Paris: Chez Gervais Alliot. 1648.

=== Studies ===
- Corblet, Jules (1868). Hagiographie du Diocese d'Amiens (in French). Vol. Tome premier. Paris: Dumoulin. Vol. 2; Vol. 3.
- Dusevel, Hyacinthe (1839). Notice historique et descriptive sur l'église cathédrale d'Amiens (second ed.). Amiens: Caron, Vitet.
- Duchesne, Louis (1915). Fastes épiscopaux de l'ancienne Gaule, Tome III. Paris: E. de Boccard. pp. 122–130. (in French)
- Jean, Armand (1891). Les évêques et les archevêques de France depuis 1682 jusqu'à 1801 (in French). Paris: A. Picard.
- Millet, Hélène; Desportes, Pierre (ed.) (1996). Fasti Ecclesiae Gallicanae. Répertoire prosopographique des évêques, dignitaires et chanoines des dioceses de France de 1200 à 1500. I. Diocèse d’Amiens. Turnhout, Brepols. (in French)
- Mioland, Jean-Marie (1848). Actes de l'église d'Amiens: recueil de tous les documents relatifs à la discipline du diocèse, de l'an 811 à l'an 1848 (in French and Latin). Vol. Tome premier. Amiens: Caron et Lambert. Tome second. Amiens: Caron et Lambert. 1849.
- Pisani, Paul (1907). Répertoire biographique de l'épiscopat constitutionnel (1791-1802) (in French). Paris: A. Picard et fils.
- Sainte-Marthe, Denis de (1751). Gallia christiana in provincia ecclesiasticas distributa (in Latin). Vol. Tomus decimus (10). Paris: Typographia Regia. pp. 1146–1377, Instrumenta, pp. 282–360.
- Salmon, Charles (1861). Histoire de saint Firmin, martyr, premier évêque d'Amiens, patron de la Navarre et des diocèses d'Amiens et de Pampelune (in French). Arras: Rousseau-Leroy.
- Société bibliographique (France) (1907). L'épiscopat français depuis le Concordat jusqu'à la Séparation (1802-1905). Paris: Librairie des Saints-Pères.
- Soyez, Edmond (1878). Notices sur les évêques d'Amiens (in French). Amiens: Langlois.
- Thierry, Augustin, ed. (1856). Collection de documents inédits sur l'histoire de France. Recueil des monuments inedits de l'histoire du Tiers Etat, Premiere serie (in French and Latin). Vol. Tome III. Paris: Imprimerie nationale.
