= Lucien Daloz =

Roman Catholic archbishop

- Archbishop Emeritus of Besançon
- Church: Roman Catholic Church
- See: Archdiocese of Besançon

Orders
- Ordination: 29 June 1955
- Consecration: 19 October 1975

Personal details
- Born: 9 October 1930 Syam, France
- Died: 31 July 2012 (aged 81) France

Lucien Charles Gilbert Daloz (9 October 1930 – 31 July 2012) was the archbishop of the Roman Catholic Archdiocese of Besançon, France.

Ordained in 1955, Daloz became bishop of Langres in 1975 and archbishop of Besançon in 1980, retiring in 2003.
