= Saint Jean Hulst =

Coordinates: 48°49′04″N 2°08′16″E

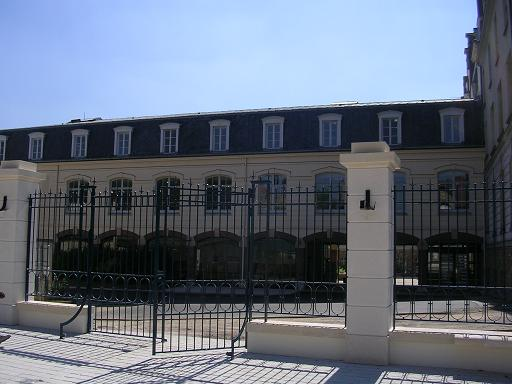
- Versailles, Île-de-France; France

Information
- Type: secondary education
- Motto: « recevoir pour mieux servir », or "receive to better serve" in word-for-word translation
- Established: 1878
- Enrollment: 3,000
- Website: Official Website

Saint Jean Hulst, founded in 1878, is a secondary school located in Versailles (France). The old name, Saint Jean de Béthune, is still often seen and used. The school has more than 3,000 students from college (the first four years of secondary education in France) to lyceum. It is known for its Baccalauréat results: 100% accepted from 2006 to 2014. It was also the third largest contributor of students to the Instituts d'études politiques (SciencesPo) in 2009.

== Famous alumni ==
=== 19th century ===
- Georges Lacombe (1868-1916), sculptor
- Henri Émilien Rousseau (1875-1933), painter
- Henri Marret (1878-1964), painter
- Paul Richaud (1887-1968), Catholic Cardinal
- Jacques de La Presle (1888-1969), composer
- Mgr René Graffin (1899-1967), missionary and Prelate
- Emmanuel d'Astier de La Vigerie (1900-1969), journalist and politician

=== 1901-1950 ===
- René Voillaume (1905-2003), priest and theologian
- Jehan Alain (1911-1940), organist and composer
- Mgr Armand-François Le Bourgeois (1911-2005), Bishop
- Maurice Teynac (1915-1992), actor
- Michel de Saint-Pierre (1916-1987), writer and journalist
- Antoine de La Garanderie (1920-2010), educator and philosopher
- Albert Ducrocq (1921-2001), cyberneticist
- Philippe Dauchez (1929- ), comedian
- François Foucart (1933- ), journalist
- Gilles de Robien (1941- ), politician
- Mgr Michel Dubost (1942- ), Bishop
- Philippe Meyer (1947- ), journalist
- François Nicolas (1947- ), composer
- Erik Arnoult, known as Érik Orsenna (1947- ), politician and novelist
- Henry de Lesquen (1949- ), politician

=== 1951-2000 ===
- Bruno Guiblet (1951- ), novelist
- Bruno Madinier (1960- ), comedian
- François de Mazières (1960- ), politician
- Vincent Régnier (1961- ), journalist
- Emmanuel Hoog (1962- ), government official
- Étienne de Montety (1965- ), writer and journalist
