= Agos-Vidalos =

- Commune
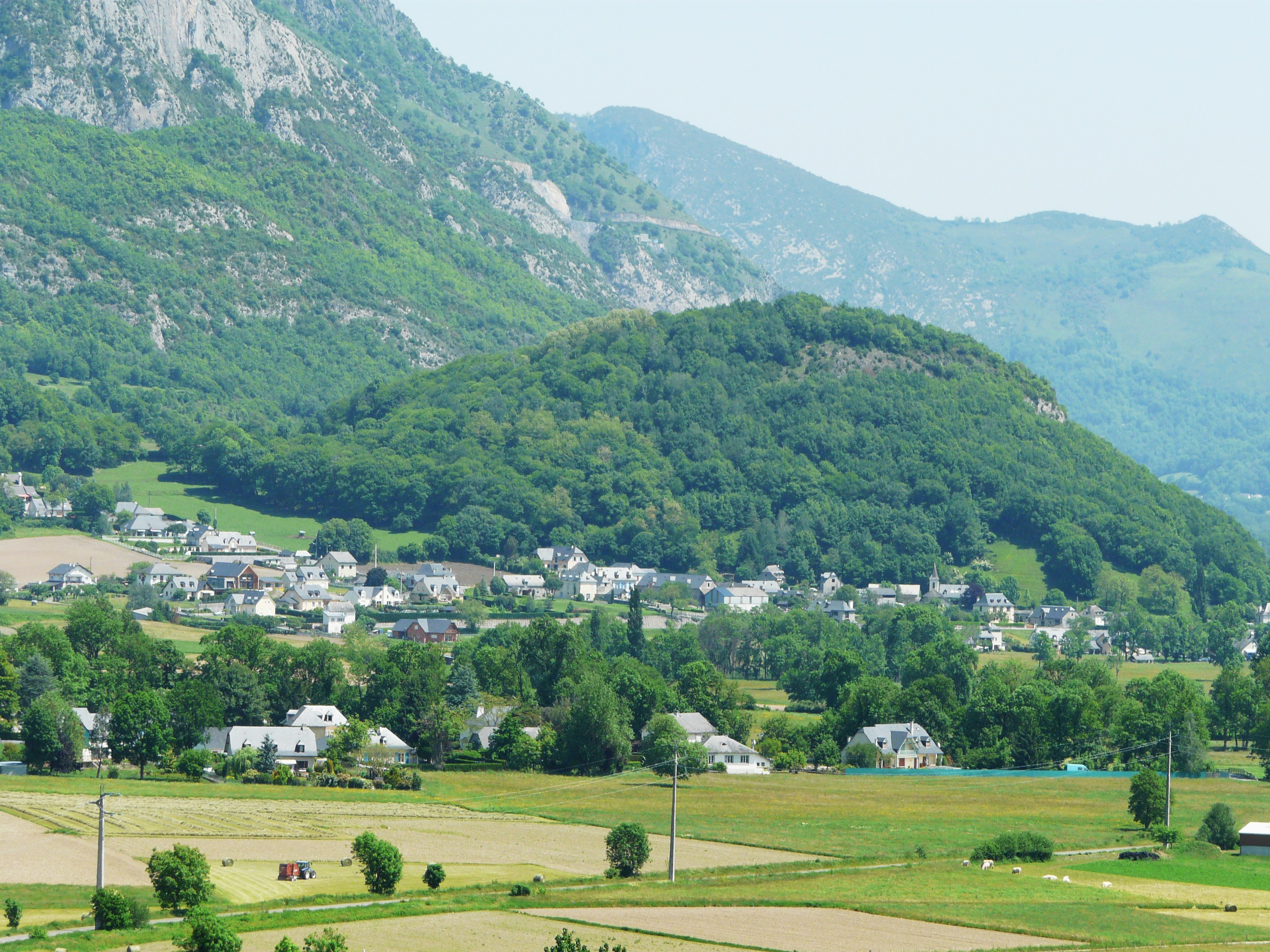
- The village of Vidalos

- Coat of arms
- Location of Agos-Vidalos
- Location within France Location within Occitanie
- Coordinates: 43°02′16″N 0°04′14″W
- Country: France
- Region: Occitania
- Department: Hautes-Pyrénées
- Arrondissement: Argelès-Gazost
- Canton: La Vallée des Gaves
- Intercommunality: Pyrénées Vallées des Gaves

Government
  - Mayor (2020–2026): Jean-Marc Abbadie
- Area^{1}: 6.11 km^{2} (2.36 sq mi)
- Elevation: 415 m (1,362 ft)
- Highest elevation: 1,360 m (4,460 ft)
- Lowest elevation: 391 m (1,283 ft)
- Population (2023): 391
  - Density: 64.0/km^{2} (166/sq mi)
- Time zone: UTC+01:00 (CET)
  - Summer (DST): UTC+02:00 (CEST)
- INSEE/Postal code: 65004 /65400
- ^{1} French Land Register data, which excludes lakes, ponds, glaciers > 1 km^{2} (0.386 sq mi or 247 acres) and river estuaries.

Agos-Vidalos (French pronunciation: [aɡɔs vidalɔs]; Occitan: Agòs e Vidalòs) is a commune in the Hautes-Pyrénées department in southwestern France.

== Population ==
Historical population
Year	Pop.	±% p.a.
1968	265	—
1975	285	+1.04%
1982	272	−0.66%
1990	270	−0.09%
1999	290	+0.80%
2007	359	+2.70%
2012	403	+2.34%
2017	416	+0.64%
2023	391	−1.03%
Source: INSEE

== See also ==
- Communes of the Hautes-Pyrénées department
