= Archdiocese of Besançon =

Catholic archdiocese in France

Coordinates: 47°14′01″N 6°01′50″E

Archdiocese of Besançon Archidiœcesis Bisuntina Archidiocèse de Besançon

Catholic
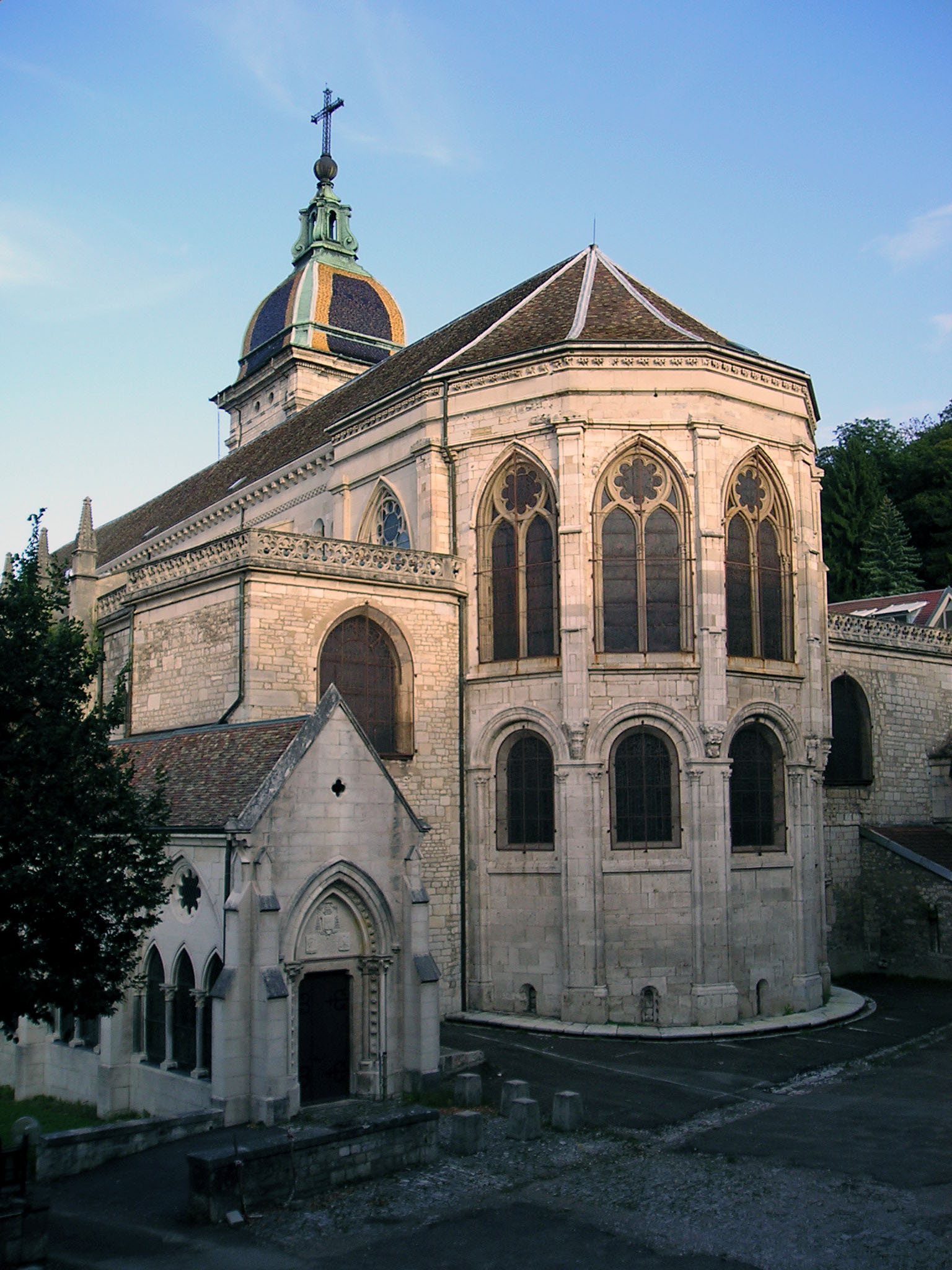
- Besançon Cathedral

- Coat of arms

Location
- Country: France
- Ecclesiastical province: Besançon

Statistics
- Area: 9,732 km^{2} (3,758 sq mi)
- Population: Total; Catholics: (as of 2022); 617,000 (est.) ▲; 569,000 (est.) ▼ (92.2%)
- Parishes: 67

Information
- Denomination: Catholic Church
- Sui iuris church: Latin Church
- Rite: Roman Rite
- Established: 4th Century
- Cathedral: Cathedral of St. John
- Patron saint: Immaculate Conception
- Secular priests: 117 diocesan ▼14 (Religious Orders); 36 Permanent Deacons ▲

Current leadership
- Pope: Leo XIV
- Metropolitan Archbishop: Jean-Luc Bouilleret

Map

Website
- besancon.mondio16.com

Besançon and its Suffragans

The Archdiocese of Besançon (Latin: Archidiœcesis Bisuntina; French: Archidiocèse de Besançon) is a Latin Church ecclesiastical territory or archdiocese of the Catholic Church in France. It comprises the département of Doubs (except for Montbéliard) and the département of Haute-Saône (except for the canton of Héricourt).

From 1034 to 1184, the archbishop had civil authority within the Holy Roman Empire as the prince-archbishop of Besançon. He gradually lost his civil power to the town council; the city became the Imperial city of Besançon in 1184. The city was annexed by France in stages, eventually being fully subsumed by France in 1792 during the French Revolution. The Archdiocese of Besançon is a metropolitan see with five suffragan dioceses in its ecclesiastical province: the Dioceses of Belfort-Montbéliard, Nancy, Saint–Claude, Saint-Dié, and Verdun.

== Early history of the diocese ==
It was once believed in the Diocese of Besançon that Christianity was introduced to the area around 54 AD by Linus, one of Jesus Christ's seventy-two disciples and the immediate successor of Peter the Apostle (d. 65), and that Linus served as the first bishop of Besançon. Although this myth has long been abandoned, Linus is still included in the episcopal lists after Ferreolus to preserve tradition.

Another local tradition states that the diocese was evangelized by Saints Ferreolus and Ferrutio (Ferréol and Ferjeux), who were sent here by St. Irenaeus, Bishop of Lyon. According to the Catholic encyclopedia, "Louis Duchesne proved that these legends belong to a chain of narratives forged in the first half of the 6th century and of which the "passion" of St. Benignus of Dijon was the initial link."

The earliest attempt to compile local traditions and related materials occurred during the time of Bishop Hugues (1031–1067), when the first episcopal list was created. Bishop Ferreolus was not included in this list until the 18th century, when François Dunod de Charnage discovered a manuscript of The Legend of Saint Ferreolus in the collection of the Collegiate Church of La Madeleine.

The Emperor Charles the Bald visited Besançon in 871. He granted the archbishops the right to coin money.

During the Middle Ages several popes visited Besançon, among them Pope Leo IX who consecrated the altar of the old Cathedral of St. Etienne in 1050, and Eugenius III who in 1148 consecrated the church of St. Jean, the new cathedral.

In a bull confirming the rights, privileges, and property of the archbishops of Besançon, dated 19 November 1049, Pope Leo IX mentions that the archbishops had a mint (moneta).

=== Emperor vs. popes ===
In 1156, Frederick Barbarossa married Beatrix, the daughter and heiress of Renaud III, the last of the hereditary counts of Burgundy. His chancellor of Burgundy was the bishop of Lausanne. In October 1157, Frederick returned to Besançon, and had himself crowned King of Burgundy and of Arles. The day after the coronation, a meeting was held between Frederick and the papal legates of Pope Adrian IV, Cardinal Bernard of San Clemente and Cardinal Roland of San Marco, the chancellor of the Holy Roman Church. In a letter read before the emperor's court, Pope Adrian reminded Frederick that he had crowned him in Rome and therefore considered the emperor his vassal—a message echoed in the cardinals' opening speech. This caused great offense, prompting Frederick to forbid the Archbishop of Besançon and other clerics from communicating with the pope. From that point forward, ecclesiastical investiture would be carried out by the emperor. On 18 November, after the meeting with the legates of the pope, Frederick named Archbishop Heraclius of Lyon his exarch.

Pope Adrian died on 1 September 1159, and the election to choose his successor resulted in two parties and two popes, Alexander III and Antipope Victor IV. Frederick supported the interest of the Victor IV, and summoned a council to meet at Pavia, on 5–11 February 1160, to judge between the two claimants. Archbishop Humbert of Besançon (1134–1162) sent a representative, but subsequently he received no favor or attention from the emperor. The Cistercians in the diocese, who sent representatives to the General Chapter at Citeux in 1161, declared firmly in favor of Pope Alexander III, which brought down the wrath of Frederick on the entire order. The monasteries of Acey, Bellevaux, and Clairefontaine were turned over for pillage. Archbishop Humbert resigned in 1162, and retired to a monastery, where he died in 1164. He was succeeded by Gauthier, the son of Duke Hugues of Burgundy, the archdeacon and dean of the Chapter, but it is not known whether Gauthier ever received confirmation from the pope. In place of Humbert, Frederick installed as archbishop Herbert, a German from Cologne, the Provost of the Chapter of Aix-la-chapelle (Aachen). In 1166, however, Herbert was still subscribing documents with the title archbishop-elect, and the title of archbishop does not appear until 1168. He died in 1172, and his funeral was attended neither by the people nor the clergy of Besançcon. His successor Eberhard (1172–1180) was also a supporter of Frederick and a schismatic, until Frederick brought the schism to an end by reconciling with Pope Alexander in July 1177, from which point Eberhard was recognized as archbishop of Besançon.

The son of Count Guillaume of Burgundy, Guido of Burgundy, who was pope from 1119 to 1123 under the name of Calixtus II, was born at Quingey, 23 km southwest of Besançon.

=== Chapter and cathedral ===
Legend says that the founder of Saint-Étienne was Linus, who lived in the mid-1st century or the late 2nd. Christianity, however, was an illegal unregistered cult until the Edict of Milan, which makes construction unlikely. The same source reports the rebuilding of the church by "Queen Helena", the mother of Constantine, under bishop Hylarius.

The cathedral of Saint Stephen (Saint-Étienne) was in complete ruins when rebuilding began under Archbishop Gauthier (1016–1030). It was completed by Archbishop Hugues de Besançon (1031–1067) and dedicated on 3 October 1048 by Pope Leo IX. Pope Innocent IV (1243–1254) granted indulgences to contributors to the restoration of Saint-Étienne. It was at the same time that construction began on a new cathedral, Saint-Jean, in a more modern style. It was consecrated by Pope Eugenius III on 5 May 1148. On 6 March 1350, lightning struck Saint-Étienne, and destroyed the roof, the furnishings, and its ornaments. The building was repaired, but it was finally pulled down by the military architect Vauban, on orders of King Louis XIV, between 1674 and 1678, to make way for the citadel of Besançcon. For a time, Besançon had two cathedrals, Saint Stephen and Saint John the Evangelist.

The cathedral was served and administered by a corporation called the Chapter. It consisted of 43 canons, four dignities, and seven lesser dignities (adjutores). The dignities were: the Dean, who presided over the Chapter, the grand archdeacon, the Cantor, the Treasurer, the archdeacon Salinarius, the archdeacon Faverniacensis, the archdeacon Graacenus, the archdeacon Luxoviensis, and the Theologus. In 1698, there were four dignities, four personae (adjutores), and 45 canons.

== Later history ==
From the 13th to 18th centuries, the archdiocese of Besançon had as suffragan dioceses: Belley, Basel, and Lausanne.

On 7 May 1254, the Emperor William of Holland confirmed the archbishops of Besançon in the right to coin money, called sephanienses after the image of Saint Étienne on them, for use throughout his diocese.

In 1520, Archbishop Antoine de Vergy (1502–1541) held a diocesan synod at his castle of Gy.

Archbishop-elect Claude de La Baume (1543–1584) presided over a diocesan synod in 1549, and published the synodial statutes in 1550. Another diocesan synod was held in 1572. Archbishop Ferdinand de Rye (1586–1636) held synods in 1588, 1589, 1590, 1591, 1592, 1593, 1594, 1597, 1599, 1600, 1604, 1605, 1607, and 1609. Additionally, Archbishop de Rye held synods in 1611, 1614, 1615, 1618, 1621, 1627, 1630, 1631, 1632, and 1633. Archbishop Claude de Achey (1637–1654) held diocesan synods in 1640, 1641, 1644, 1647, 1648, 1650, 1651, 1652, and 1653. Diocesan synods were held by Archbishop Antoine-Pierre de Grammont (1662–1698) in 1663, 1664, 1665, 1666, 1669, 1670, 1671, 1673, 1674, 1675, 1676, 1677, 1678, 1679, 1680, and 1691.

In 1598, the Society of Jesus (Jesuits) entered into an agreement with the city to establish a collège in Besançon.

On 24 January 1600, Pope Clement VIII granted the Archduke Albert, ruler of the Pays-Bas, in his capacity as ruler of the county of Burgundy, the privilege of naming candidates to many ecclesiastical benefices in the archdiocese of Besançon. Pope Urban VIII granted the same privilege to King Philip IV of Spain on 16 October 1640, and the privilege was also granted to his successor, Charles II.

Archbishop Claude de Achey (1637–1654) held a provincial synod in Besançon on 19 May 1648. It condemned the Jansenist book De la fréquente Communion by Antoine Arnauld. The archbishop would not permit the institution of any cleric into his benefice unless and until he took an oath to support the bulls of Pope Urban VIII and Pope Innocent X against Jansenist propositions.

Archbishop Antoine-Pierre de Grammont (1662–1698) laid the cornerstone for a new seminary on 25 July 1670.

=== Annexation to France ===
In May 1674, after a siege of nine days, Besançon was captured by the forces led by King Louis XIV of France, and the Franche-Comté was annexed. The annexation was formalized by the Treaty of Nimègue between King Louis XIV and King Philip II of Spain on 17 September 1678. Besançon was named the capital of the province of Franche-Comté and the parliament was established there.

In June 1683, King Louis XIV and Queen Marie-Thérèse paid an official visit to Besançon, attended a pontifical Mass of Archbishop de Grammont, and participated in the processions of Corpus Christi. In 1691, Besançon became the seat of a university, which had been transferred from Dijon. Students from both the seminary and the Jesuit college in Besançon sent their students to the university for advanced study in philosophy and theology.

On 20 May 1686, Pope Innocent XI transferred the privilege in the county of Burgundy which had been granted to the kings of Spain to King Louis XIV of France.

On 31 July 1698, Pope Innocent XII granted to the French king the right to nominate the candidate for the vacant see of Besançcon. In 1698, the cathedral Chapter yielded to the king of France the right to name the archbishop when a vacancy occurred.

On the eve of the French Revolution, in 1790, the diocese of Besançon had 840 parishes, 28 abbeys, 14, collegial churches, and 99 priories.

=== French Revolution ===
Even before it directed its attention to the Church directly, the National Constituent Assembly attacked the institution of monasticism. On 13 February 1790. it issued a decree which stated that the government would no longer recognize solemn religious vows taken by either men or women. In consequence, Orders and Congregations which lived under a Rule were suppressed in France. Members of either sex were free to leave their monasteries or convents if they wished, and could claim an appropriate pension by applying to the local municipal authority.

The National Constituent Assembly ordered the replacement of political subdivisions of the ancien régime with subdivisions called "departments", to be characterized by a single administrative city in the center of a compact area. The decree was passed on 22 December 1789, the boundaries fixed on 26 February 1790, with the institution to be effective on 4 March 1790. A new department was created called "Doubs," and Besançon became the principal city in the department. The National Constituent Assembly then, on 6 February 1790, instructed its ecclesiastical committee to prepare a plan for the reorganization of the clergy. At the end of May, its work was presented as a draft Civil Constitution of the Clergy, which, after vigorous debate, was approved on 12 July 1790. There was to be one diocese in each department, requiring the suppression of approximately fifty dioceses. Besançon became the seat of the "Metropole de l'Est."

Archbishop Raymond de Durfort refused to take the compulsory oath to the Civil Constitution, and withdrew into exile upon the arrival of a "Constitutional Bishop". He died at Soleure in Switzerland on 19 March 1792, and his senior suffragan, Bishop Bernard Emmanuel von Lenzburg of Lausanne assumed the administration of the diocese of Besançon. When Lenzburg died on 14 September 1795, the administratorship passed to Bishop Franz Xaver von Neveu of Basel.

The Concordat of 1802 gave the Diocese of Besançon all those districts which, in 1822, constituted the Diocese of St.-Claude. In 1806, Besançon was given jurisdiction over the three parishes of the Principality of Neufchâtel (Switzerland) which fell under the control of the bishopric of Lausanne in 1814. In 1870, after the annexation of Alsace-Lorraine by Germany, the district of Belfort was withdrawn from the bishopric of Strasburg and attached to the diocese of Besançon.

=== Reconstruction ===
The French Directory fell in the coup engineered by Talleyrand and Napoleon on 10 November 1799. The coup resulted in the establishment of the French Consulate, with Napoleon as the First Consul. To advance his aggressive military foreign policy, he decided to make peace with the Catholic Church and the Papacy. On 29 November 1801, in the concordat of 1801 between the French Consulate, headed by First Consul Napoleon Bonaparte, and Pope Pius VII, the archbishopric of Besançon and its suffragan Belley, and all the other dioceses in France, were suppressed. This removed all the institutional contaminations and novelties introduced by the Constitutional Church. The diocesan structure was then re-established, with the metropolitan archdiocese of Besançon (Doubs) and its suffragan dioceses Dijon and Autun (in Burgundy), Metz, Nancy, and Strasbourg (in Alsace-Lorraine). The Concordat was registered as a French law on 8 April 1802.

In 1814, the French monarchy was restored, and on 24 May 1814, the pope returned to Rome from exile in Savona. Work began immediately on a new concordat, to regularize the relations between the two parties. In implementation of the concordat of 27 July 1817, between King Louis XVIII and Pope Pius VII, the papal bull "Commissa nobis" was issued on 27 July 1817, but the French Parliament refused to ratify the concordat. It was not until 6 October 1822 that a revised version of the papal bull, now called "Paternae Charitatis", fortified by an ordonnance of Louis XVIII of 13 January 1823 ordering its registration, received the acceptance of all parties. The archdiocese of Besançon (Doubs) was assigned as suffragans the dioceses of Strasbourg, Metz, Verdun, Belley, Saint-Die, and Nancy. Dijon and Autun were withdrawn from Besançon.

In June 1874, after the Franco-Prussian War, at the request of the French government, Pope Pius IX removed the churches of Metz and Strasburg from the metropolitan jurisdiction of the archbishop of Besançon, and made them exempt, under the direct control of the Holy See.

On 3 November 1979, Pope John Paul II issued an apostolic constitution (papal bull), "Qui Divino Consilio", removing from the diocese of Besançon the territory of Belfort; the "paus de Montbéliard" in the department of Doubs; and the arrondissement called "Héricourt" with the town of "Chalonvillars", to form the new diocese of Belfort-Montbéliard. The diocese of Belfort-Montbéliard was made a suffragan of the metropolitanate of Besançon.

== Spiritual life ==
Peter Fourier (1565–1640), who inaugurated systematic education for girls, was born at Mirecourt, c. 120 km. north of Besançon, in the diocese of Besançon. The miracle attributed to the "Sacred Host of Faverney", during a fire in the year 1608 at the Benedictine Abbey of Nôtre-Dame de la Blanche, was annually commemorated by elaborate ceremonies on 30 October. The places of pilgrimage were Notre Dame du Chêne at Scey; Notre Dame d'Aigremont; the pilgrimage of Saint Peter of Tarentaise at Cirey-les-Bellevaux, where St. Pierre de Tarentaise died in 1174; Notre Dame des Jacobins at Besançon; and Notre Dame de la Motte at Vesoul.

The Jesuit Claude-Adrien Nonnotte (1711–1793), an adversary of Voltaire, was a native of Besançon.

=== Abbeys founded from the diocese ===
The monastery of Luxeuil, founded by Columbanus (d. 615), gave to the diocese of Besançon a series of holy men. First came the direct successors of Columbanus: the Abbot Eustasius who founded a celebrated school in this monastery; the Abbot Valbert who sent monks to found the Abbeys of St. Valéry, St. Omer, and St. Bertin, and died in 665; the Abbot Ingofroid; Donatus, who became Bishop of Besançon; and Ansegisus, author of a celebrated collection of capitularies.

The Abbey of Lure (Luthra), (in Haute-Saône, was founded at the beginning of the 7th century by St. Déicole (Deicolus), or Desle, disciple of Columbanus; later its abbots were princes of the Holy Empire. The Abbey of Beaume les Dames, founded in the 5th century and in which Gontram, King of Burgundy, was buried, was the school where Odo, afterwards Abbot of Cluny, studied in the tenth century; at the end of the eighth century there was built near it an abbey (Palma) for Benedictine nuns, members of the nobility. During the French Revolution the church of this abbey was laid waste.

Other saints of the Diocese of Besançon include the hermit Aldegrin (10th century).

== Bishops ==
=== To 600 ===
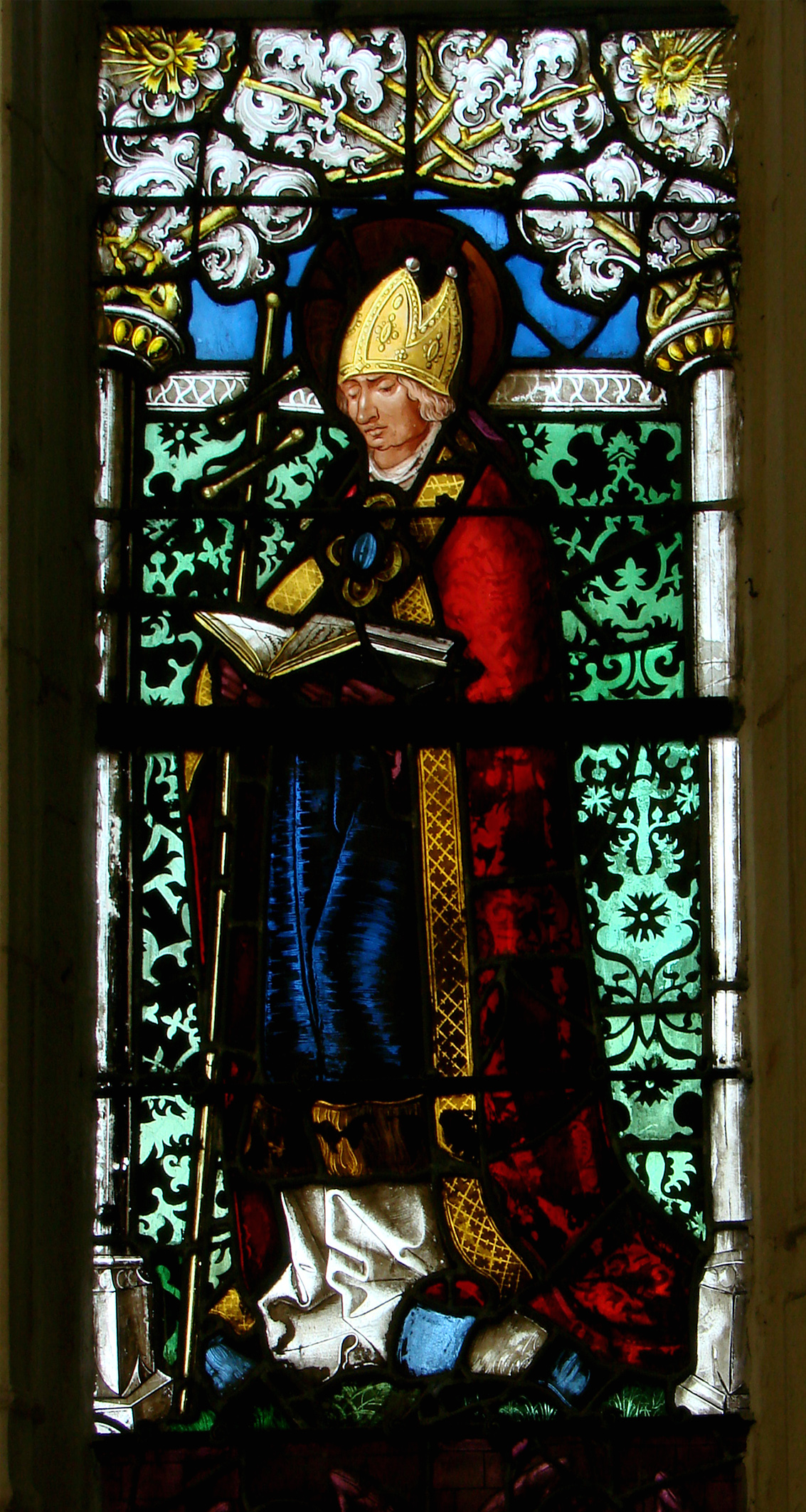
Claudius, bishop of Besançon during the 7th century.

According to Georges Goyau, writing in the first edition of the Catholic Encyclopedia, "the catalogue of the earliest bishops of Besançon is to be read with caution."

Ferreolus 180?–211?
Linus
Antidius c. 267
Germanus

- Maximinus died before 304
- Paulinus died c. 310
- Eusebius
- Hilarius
- Pancharius (attested 346)
- Justus c. 362
- Aegnanus died c. 374
- Sylvester I 376–396?
- Anianus (4th century)
- Fronimius
- Desideratus
- Leontius ?–443
- Chelidonius c. 445, died 451?
- Antidius II
- Chelmegisl
- Claudius (I) c. 517
- Urbicus c. 549
- Tetradius (I) c. 570
- Sylvester (II.) c. 580
- Vitalis (I)
- St. Rothadius, a monk at Luxeuil and organizer of the monastic life

=== 600 to 1000 ===
- Nicetas died c. 611
- Protagius 614?–624?
- Donatus c. 627–660
- Nicetius c. 670
- Terniscus c. 680
- Gervase c. 680, died 685)
- Claudius, 685, died 693?
- Felix c. 710
- Tetradius II died 732
- Albo c. 742
- Wandelbert
- Evrald
- Arnoul
- Hervaeus 757–762
- Gedeon died 796
- Bernoin 811–829
- Amalwin 838–840
- Arduicus (843–872)
- Theoderic (I) (872–895)
- Berengarius (895–after 927)
- Aymin (c. 915)
- Guntherius (between c. 927 and 932)
- Gottfried (I) (944–953)
- Guy
- Guichard (after 983)
- Leutald (attested 993–994)

=== 1000–1300 ===
- Hektor (1002–1015)
- Waltherius (1016–1031)
- Hugues de Besançon (1031–1067)
- Hugo de Montfaucon (c. 1067–1085)
- Hugo III of Burgundy (1085–1101)
- Hugo IV (1102–1107)
- Guillaume I de Arguel (1109?–1117)
- Anseric de Montréal (1117–1134)
- Humbert (1134–1162)
- Gauthier (1162–1163)
- Herbert (1163–1172) (schismatic)
- Eberhard de Saint-Quentin (1172–1180)
- Theoderic de Montfaucon (1180–1191)
- Etienne de Vienne (1191–1193)
- Amadeus de Tramelay (1197–1220)
- Gerard de Rougemont (1221–1225)
- Jean Allegrin, O.Clun. (1225–1227)
- Nicolas de Flavigny (1227–1235)
- Gottfried (1236–1241)
- Jean II. (1242–1244)
- Guillaume de la Tour (1245–1268)
- Odo de Rougemont (1269–1301)

=== 1300–1500 ===
- 1301–1312 : Hugues de Chalons
- 1312–1333 : Vital de Maignaut
- 1333–1355 : Hugues de Vienne
- 1355–1361 : Jean de Vienne
- 1361–1362 : Louis de Montbéliard
- 1363–1370 : Aymon de Villersexel
- 1371–1391 : Guillaume de Vergy
- 1391–1404 : Gerard d'Athies (Avignon Obedience)
- 1405–1429 : Thiébaud de Rougemont (Avignon Obedience)
- 1429–1437 : Jean de La Rochetaillée

[1437; Jean Fruin de Poligny ]

- 1437–1438 : François Condulmer
- 1438 : Jean de Norry
- 1439–1462 : Quentin Ménard
- 1463–1498 : Charles de Neufchâtel

=== 1500–1800 ===
- 1498–1502 : François de Busleyden
- 1502–1541 : Antoine de Vergy
- 1541–1544 : Cardinal Pierre de la Beaume
- 1543–1584 : Claude de La Baume
- 1584–1586 : Cardinal Antoine Perrenot de Granvelle
- 1586–1636 : Ferdinand de Rye
- 1636–1637 : François de Rye
- 1637–1654 : Claude de Achey
- [1654] : Charles Emanuel de Gorrevot, never consecrated]
- 1659–1662 : Jean Jacques Fauche
- 1662–1698 : Antoine-Pierre de Grammont
- 1698–1717 : Francois-Joseph de Grammont

1717–1721 : René de Mornay

- 1723–1732 : Honoré de Grimaldi
- 1733–1734 : Antoine-Francois de Bliterswijk-Montcley
- 1735–1754 : Antoine Pierre (II) de Grammont
- 1754–1774 : Antoine Clairiard de Choiseul de Beaupré

(1756–1791) Claude-François-Ignace de Ran (Auxiliary bishop)

- 1774–1792 : Raymond de Durfort

Constitutional Church (schismatic)

- 1791–1793 : Philippe-Charles-François Seguin
- 1798–1801 : Demandre, Jean-Baptiste

=== From 1800 ===
- Claude Le Coz (1802–1815)
- Gabriel Cortois de Pressigny 1817–1823
- Paul-Ambroise Frère de Villefrancon 1823–1828
- Louis-François-Auguste de Rohan-Chabot (1828–1833)
- Louis-Guillaume-Valentin DuBourg, P.S.S. 3 Feb 1833 to 12 Dec 1833
- Jacques-Marie-Adrien-Césaire Mathieu (1834–1875) (Cardinal in 1850)
- Pierre-Antoine-Justin Paulinier 1875–1881
- Joseph-Alfred Foulon (30 Mar 1882 – 26 May 1887), appointed Archbishop of Lyon (-Vienne) (Cardinal in 1887)
- Marie-Joseph-Jean-Baptiste-André-Clément-Fulbert Petit 1894–1909
- François-Léon Gauthey (20 Jan 1910 – 25 Jul 1918)
- Louis Humbrecht (14 Sep 1918 – 28 Jun 1927)
- Charles Binet (31 Oct 1927 – 15 Jul 1936) (Cardinal in 1927)
- Maurice-Louis Dubourg (9 Dec 1936 – 31 Jan 1954)
- Marcel-Marie-Henri-Paul Dubois (10 Jun 1954 – 2 Jul 1966)
- Marc-Armand Lallier (26 Aug 1966 – 6 Mar 1980)
- Lucien Daloz (12 Dec 1980 – 13 Aug 2003)
- André Jean René Lacrampe, Ist. del Prado (13 Aug 2003 – 25 Apr 2013)
- Jean-Luc Marie Maurice Louis Bouilleret (17 November 2013 – present)

== See also ==
- Auxiliary bishops of Besançon
- Catholic Church in France

== Bibliography ==
=== Reference works ===
- Gams, Pius Bonifatius (1873). Series episcoporum Ecclesiae catholicae: quotquot innotuerunt a beato Petro apostolo. Ratisbon: Typis et Sumptibus Georgii Josephi Manz. (Use with caution; obsolete)
- Eubel, Conradus, ed. (1913). Hierarchia catholica, Tomus 1 (second ed.). Münster: Libreria Regensbergiana. (in Latin)
- Eubel, Conradus, ed. (1914). Hierarchia catholica, Tomus 2 (second ed.). Münster: Libreria Regensbergiana. (in Latin)
- Eubel, Conradus; Gulik, Guilelmus, eds. (1923). Hierarchia catholica, Tomus 3 (second ed.). Münster: Libreria Regensbergiana.
- Gauchat, Patritius (Patrice) (1935). Hierarchia catholica IV (1592–1667). Münster: Libraria Regensbergiana.
- Ritzler, Remigius; Sefrin, Pirminus (1952). Hierarchia catholica medii et recentis aevi V (1667–1730). Patavii: Messagero di S. Antonio.
- Ritzler, Remigius; Sefrin, Pirminus (1958). Hierarchia catholica medii et recentis aevi VI (1730–1799). Patavii: Messagero di S. Antonio.
- Ritzler, Remigius; Sefrin, Pirminus (1968). Hierarchia Catholica medii et recentioris aevi sive summorum pontificum, S. R. E. cardinalium, ecclesiarum antistitum series... A pontificatu Pii PP. VII (1800) usque ad pontificatum Gregorii PP. XVI (1846) (in Latin). Vol. VII. Monasterii: Libr. Regensburgiana.
- Remigius Ritzler; Pirminus Sefrin (1978). Hierarchia catholica Medii et recentioris aevi... A Pontificatu PII PP. IX (1846) usque ad Pontificatum Leonis PP. XIII (1903) (in Latin). Vol. VIII. Il Messaggero di S. Antonio.
- Pięta, Zenon (2002). Hierarchia catholica medii et recentioris aevi... A pontificatu Pii PP. X (1903) usque ad pontificatum Benedictii PP. XV (1922) (in Latin). Vol. IX. Padua: Messagero di San Antonio. ISBN 978-88-250-1000-8.

=== Studies ===
- Castan, Auguste (1877). Les évêques auxiliaires du siége métropolitain de Besançon. (in French). Besançon: DuDivers 1877.
- Castan, Auguste (1891). "La concession monétaire de Charles le Chauve à l’Eglise de Besançon," (in French), in: Revue numismatique (1891), pp. 47–59.
- Duchesne, Louis (1915). Fastes episcopaux de l'ancienne Gaule. Vol. III: Les provinces du Nord et de l'Est. (in French). Paris: A. Fontemoing, 1915. (pp. 198–216.)
- Dunod de Charnage, François Ignace (1750). Histoire de l'eglise, ville et diocése de Besançon. (in French). Besançon: C.J. Daclin. Volume 1 (1750).
- Du Tems, Hugues (1774). Le clergé de France, ou tableau historique et chronologique des archevêques, évêques, abbés, abbesses et chefs des chapitres principaux du royaume, depuis la fondation des églises jusqu'à nos jours (in French). Vol. Tome premier. Paris: Delalain.
- Gauthier, Jules (1901). Etude archéologique sur la cathédrale St. Etienne de Besançon. (in French). Paris: Imprimerie nationale 1901.
- Hauréau, Barthelemy (1860). Gallia christiana: in provincias ecclesiaticas distributa. (in Latin). Vol. 15. Paris: Firmin Didot, 1860. pp. 1–112; Instrumenta pp. 1–123.
- Jean, Armand (1891). Les évêques et les archevêques de France depuis 1682 jusqu'à 1801 (in French). Paris: A. Picard. pp. 459–467.
- Hours, Henri (ed.) (1999): Fasti Ecclesiae Gallicanae. Répertoire prosopographique des évêques, dignitaires et chanoines des diocèses de France de 1200 à 1500. IV. Diocèse de Besançon. Turnhout, Brepols. (in French)
- Loye, Léopold (1902) Histoire de l'Eglise de Besançon. (Besançon: Paul Jacquin). Volume 1 (1901). Volume 2 (1902). Volume 3 (1902). Volume 4 (1902). Volume 5 (1903). Volume 6 (1903).
- Morey, Joseph (1869). Le diocèse de Besançon au dix-septième siècle. visite pastorale d'Antoine Pierre de Grammont (1665–1668). (in French). Besançon: J. Jacquin 1869.
- Pisani, Paul (1907). Répertoire biographique de l'épiscopat constitutionnel (1791–1802) (in French). Paris: A. Picard et fils.
- Richard, Jean François Nicolas (1847, 1851). Histoire des diocèses de Besançon et de Saint-Claude. (in French). Besançon: Librairie ecclésiastique de Cornu. Volume 1. Volume 2.
- Société bibliographique (France) (1907). L'épiscopat français depuis le Concordat jusqu'à la Séparation (1802–1905). Paris: Librairie des Saints-Pères. pp. 346–350.
- Surugue, R. (1930). Les Archeveques de Besancon. (in French). Besançon 1930.
