= List of bishops in France =

This list of bishops in France includes the names of the living Catholic bishops of the dioceses of France whether they are active or retired, French or not, as of 2021. The names of the French Cardinals, including possibly those who are not bishops, appear in bold in the list. The mention emeritus indicates that the pope officially accepted the resignation of a bishop, usually after he has exceeded the age limit of seventy-five years imposed by canon law, sometimes for other reasons such as reasons health. He is no longer in office and his position as bishop of this diocese becomes honorary. Active Catholic bishops on this list are also members of the Bishops' Conference of France.

== Metropolitan France ==
N	Diocese	Bishop	Auxiliary Bishop	Bishop Emeritus
1	Agen	Alexandre de Bucy; Pierre-Marie Carré (Apostolic administrator)		Hubert Herbreteau
2	Aire et Dax	Nicolas Souchu		Hervé Gaschignard
3	Aix-en-Provence et Arles	Christian Delarbre (archbishop)		Christophe Dufour (archbishop emeritus)
4	Ajaccio	**François-Xavier Bustillo (cardinal)**		
5	Albi, Castres et Lavaur	Jean-Louis Balsa (archbishop)		Jean Legrez (archbishop emeritus)
6	Amiens	Gérard Le Stang		
7	Angers	Emmanuel Delmas		Jean-Louis Bruguès (archbishop ad personam)
8	Angoulême	Hervé Gosselin		Claude Dagens
9	Annecy	Yves Le Saux		Yves Boivineau
10	Arras, Boulogne sur Mer et Saint Omer	Olivier Leborgne		Jean-Paul Jaeger
11	Auch, Condom Lectoure et Lombez	Bertrand Lacombe (archbishop)		Maurice Gardès (archbishop emeritus)
12	Autun, Chalon et Mâcon	Benoît Rivière		
13	Avignon	François Fonlupt (archbishop)		Jean-Pierre Cattenoz (archbishop emeritus)
14	Bayeux et Lisieux	Jacques Habert		Jean-Claude Boulanger
15	Bayonne, Lescar et Oloron	Marc Aillet		Pierre Molères
16	Beauvais Noyon et Senlis	Jacques Benoit-Gonnin		
17	Belfort-Montbéliard	Denis Jachiet		Claude Schockert
18	Belley-Ars	Pascal Roland		Guy Bagnard
19	Besançon	Jean-Luc Bouilleret (archbishop)		
20	Blois	vacant		
21	Bordeaux et Bazas	Jean-Paul James (archbishop)	Jean-Marie Le Vert	**Jean-Pierre Ricard (cardinal)**
22	Bourges	Jérôme Beau (archbishop)		Armand Maillard (archbishop emeritus); Hubert Barbier (archbishop emeritus)
23	Cahors	Laurent Camiade		
24	Cambrai	Vincent Dollmann (archbishop)		
25	Carcassonne et Narbonne	Bruno Valentin		Jacques Despierre; Alain Planet
26	Châlons-en-Champagne	vacant		Gilbert Louis
27	Chambéry, Maurienne et Tarentaise	Thibault Verny (archbishop)		
28	Chartres	Philippe Christory		
29	Clermont	François Kalist (archbishop)		
30	Coutances et Avranches	Grégoire Cador		
31	Créteil	Dominique Blanchet		Michel Santier
32	Digne-les-Bains, Riez et Sisteron	Emmanuel Gobilliard		François-Xavier Loizeau
33	Dijon	Antoine Hérouard (archbishop)		Roland Minnerath (archbishop emeritus)
34	Évreux	Olivier de Cagny		Christian Nourrichard
35	Évry-Corbeil-Essonnes	Michel Pansard		Michel Dubost
36	Fréjus et Toulon	Dominique Rey	François Touvet (coadjutor bishop)	
37	Gap et Embrun	Xavier Malle		Jean-Michel di Falco
38	Grenoble et Vienne	Jean-Marc Eychenne		
39	Langres	Joseph de Metz-Noblat		Philippe Gueneley
40	La Rochelle et Saintes	Georges Colomb; François Jacolin (apostolic administrator)		Bernard Housset
41	Laval	Matthieu Dupont		
42	Le Havre	Jean-Luc Brunin		
43	Le Mans	Jean-Pierre Vuillemin		
44	Le Puy-en-Velay	Yves Baumgarten		
45	Lille	Laurent Le Boulc'h (archbishop)		Gérard Defois (archbishop emeritus); Gérard Coliche (Auxiliary bishop emeritus)
46	Limoges	Pierre-Antoine Bozo		
47	Luçon	François Jacolin		Alain Castet
48	Lyon	Olivier de Germay (archbishop)	Patrick Le Gal; Loïc Lagadec; Thierry Brac de La Perrière	**Philippe Barbarin (cardinal)**
49	Marseille	**Jean-Marc Aveline (cardinal)**		Georges Pontier (archbishop emeritus)
50	Meaux	Jean-Yves Nahmias	Guillaume Leschallier de Lisle	
51	Mende	Benoît Bertrand		
52	Metz	Philippe Ballot (archbishop ad personam)		Pierre Raffin; Jean-Christophe Lagleize
53	Montauban	Alain Guellec		Jacques de Saint-Blanquat; Bernard Ginoux
54	Montpellier, Lodève Béziers Agde et Saint Pons de Thomières	Norbert Turini (archbishop)		Guy Thomazeau (Archbishop emeritus); Pierre-Marie Carré (archbishop emeritus)
55	Moulins	Marc Beaumont		
56	Nancy -Toul	Pierre-Yves Michel		Jean-Louis Papin
57	Nanterre	Matthieu Rougé		Gérard Daucourt
58	Nantes	Laurent Percerou		Georges Soubrier
59	Nevers	Grégoire Drouot		
60	Nice	Jean-Philippe Nault		Louis Sankalé; Jean Bonfils; André Marceau
61	Nîmes, Uzès et Alès	Nicolas Brouwet		Robert Wattebled
62	Orléans	Jacques Blaquart		André Fort
63	Pamiers, Couserans et Mirepoix	Benoît Gschwind		
64	Paris	Laurent Ulrich (archbishop)	Philippe Marsset; Emmanuel Tois	**Cardinal André Vingt-Trois**; Michel Aupetit (Archbishop emeritus)
65	Périgueux et Sarlat	Philippe Mousset		Michel Mouïsse
66	Perpignan-Elne	Thierry Scherrer		
67	Poitiers	Jérôme Beau (archbishop)		Albert Rouet (archbishop emeritus)
68	Pontoise	Stanislas Lalanne		
69	Quimper, Cornouailles et Léon	Laurent Dognin		
70	Reims	Eric de Moulins-Beaufort (archbishop)	Étienne Vető	Thierry Jordan (archbishop emeritus); Joseph Boishu (auxiliary bishop emeritus)
71	Rennes, Dol et Saint Malo	Pierre d'Ornellas (archbishop)	Jean Bondu	
72	Rodez et Vabres	Luc Meyer		
73	Rouen	Dominique Lebrun (archbishop)		Jean-Charles Descubes (archbishop emeritus)
74	Saint-Brieuc et Tréguier	Denis Moutel		Lucien Fruchaud
75	Saint-Claude	Jean-Luc Garin		
76	Saint-Denis	vacant		
77	Saint-Dié	vacant		Jean-Paul Mathieu; Paul-Marie Guillaume
78	Saint-Étienne	Sylvain Bataille		
79	Saint-Flour	Didier Noblot		Bruno Grua
80	Séez	Bruno Feillet		
81	Sens et Auxerre	Pascal Wintzer (archbishop)		
82	Soissons, Laon et Saint-Quentin	Renauld de Dinechin		
83	Strasbourg	Pascal Delannoy (archbishop)	Christian Kratz	Joseph Doré (archbishop emeritus); Jean-Pierre Grallet (archbishop emeritus); Luc Ravel (archbishop emeritus); Gilles Reithinger (Auxiliary bishop emeritus)
84	Tarbes et Lourdes	Jean-Marc Micas		Jacques Perrier
85	Toulouse, Saint Bertrand de Comminges et Rieux	Guy de Kerimel (archbishop)	Jean-Pierre Batut	Émile Marcus (archbishop emeritus); Robert Le Gall (Archbishop emeritus)
86	Tours	Vincent Jordy (archbishop)		Bernard-Nicolas Aubertin (archbishop emeritus)
87	Troyes	Alexandre Joly		Marc Stenger
88	Tulle	Francis Bestion		Bernard Charrier
89	Valence, Die et Saint-Paul-Trois-Châteaux	François Durand		
90	Vannes	Raymond Centène		
91	Verdun	Jean-Paul Gusching		François Maupu
92	Versailles	Luc Crépy		Éric Aumonier
93	Viviers	Hervé Giraud (archbishop ad personam)		François Blondel
94	**Diocèse aux armées françaises** (Ordinariate)	Antoine de Romanet		
95	**Mission de France** (territorial prelature)	Hervé Giraud (Prelate)		Yves Patenôtre (Prelate emeritus); Georges Gilson (Prelate emeritus)

== Overseas France ==
N	Diocese	Bishop	Auxiliary Bishop	Bishop Emeritus
1	Basse-Terre and Pointe-à-Pitre	Philippe Guiougou		Jean-Yves Riocreux
2	Cayenne	Alain Ransay		Emmanuel Lafont
3	Saint-Pierre and Fort-de-France	David Macaire (archbishop)		Michel Méranville (Archbishop emeritus)
4	Taiohae (or Tefenuaenata) (Marquesas Islands)	Pascal Chang-Soi		Guy Chevalier
5	Wallis and Futuna Islands	Susitino Sionepoe		Ghislain de Rasilly
6	Nouméa	Michel-Marie Calvet (archbishop)		
7	Papeete	Jean-Pierre Cottanceau (archbishop)		
8	Saint-Denis of Reunion	Pascal Chane-Teng		Gilbert Aubry

== Oriental Churches in France ==
N	Diocese	Bishop	Auxiliary Bishop	Bishop Emeritus
1	Eparchy of the Holy Cross of Paris of the Armenian Catholics of France	Elie Yéghiayan		Jean Teyrouz
2	Eparchy Our Lady of Lebanon of Paris Maronites	vacant Peter Karam (apostolic administrator)		Nasser Gemayel
3	Eparchy Saint Vladimir the Great of Paris of the Ukrainians	Ihor Rantsya		
