= François de Rovérié de Cabrières =

His Eminence François de Rovérié de Cabrières
- Bishop of Montpellier
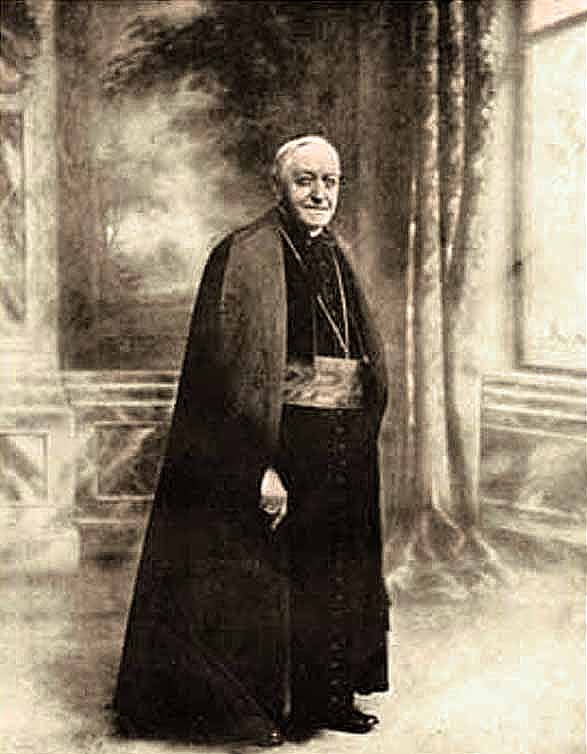
- The cardinal seen in a postcard.
- Church: Roman Catholic Church
- Diocese: Montpellier
- See: Montpellier
- Appointed: 16 January 1874
- Term ended: 21 December 1921
- Predecessor: François-Marie-Joseph Lecourtier
- Successor: René-Pierre Mignen
- Other post: Cardinal-Priest of Santa Maria della Vittoria (1911-21)

Orders
- Ordination: 24 September 1853 by Jean-François-Marie Cart
- Consecration: 19 March 1874 by Claude-Henri-Augustin Plantier
- Created cardinal: 27 November 1911 by Pope Pius X
- Rank: Cardinal-Priest

Personal details
- Born: François-Marie-Anatole de Rovérié de Cabrières; 30 August 1830 Beaucaire, Nîmes, French Kingdom
- Died: 21 December 1921 (aged 91) Montpellier, French Third Republic
- Buried: Montpellier Cathedral
- Parents: Eugène de Cabrières; Yvonne Guillemette Du Vivier de Fay-Solignac
- Motto: Non humore terrae vigebit - nihil nisi divinum timere
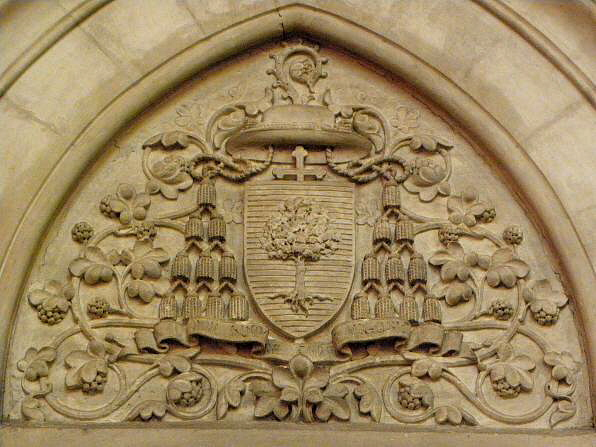
- Coat of arms

Styles of François de Rovérié de Cabrières
- Reference style: His Eminence
- Spoken style: Your Eminence
- Informal style: Cardinal
- See: Montpellier

François-Marie-Anatole de Rovérié de Cabrières (30 August 1830 – 21 December 1921) was a French Cardinal of the Roman Catholic Church. He served as Bishop of Montpellier from 1874 until his death, and was elevated to the cardinalate in 1911.

== Biography ==
François de Rovérié de Cabrières was born in Beaucaire, and studied at College of the Assumption in Nîmes, and the Seminary of Saint-Sulpice in Paris.

He was ordained to the priesthood on 24 September 1853 and then did pastoral work in Nîmes until 1874, serving as director of the Minor Seminary of Nîmes and of Collège de l'Assomption (1855-1859), and private secretary to Bishop Claude-Henri Plantier. He was also made a cathedral canon on 5 January 1871, and later honorary vicar general.

On 16 January 1874, Rovérié was appointed Bishop of Montpellier by Pope Pius IX. He received his episcopal consecration on the following 19 March from Bishop Plantier, with Bishops Julien Meirireu and Gaspard Mermillod serving as co-consecrators. Rovérié was granted the right to wear the pallium, traditionally reserved for metropolitan bishops, on 15 July 1890.

Pope Pius X created him Cardinal-Priest of S. Maria della Vittoria in the consistory of 27 November 1911. Rovérié was one of the cardinal electors who participated in the 1914 papal conclave, which selected Pope Benedict XV.

Cardinal Rovérié died in Montpellier, at the age of 91. He is buried in the cathedral of Montpellier.

Catholic Church titles
Preceded by François-Marie Lecourtier	Bishop of Montpellier; 1874–1921	Succeeded by René-Pierre Mignen
Records
Preceded by Angelo di Pietro	Eldest Member of the Sacred College; 5 December 1914 – 21 December 1921	Succeeded by Giuseppe Antonio Ermenegildo Prisco
