= Pierre Eyt =

French cardinal

His Eminence Pierre Eyt
- Archbishop of Bordeaux
- Church: Roman Catholic Church
- Archdiocese: Bordeaux
- See: Bordeaux
- Appointed: 31 May 1989
- Term ended: 11 June 2001
- Predecessor: Marius-Félix-Antoine Maziers
- Successor: Jean-Pierre Ricard
- Other post: Cardinal-Priest of Santissima Trinità al Monte Pincio (1994-2001)
- Previous post: Coadjutor Archbishop of Bordeaux (1986-89)

Orders
- Ordination: 29 June 1961 by Paul Joseph Marie Gouyon
- Consecration: 28 September 1986 by Marius-Félix-Antoine Maziers
- Created cardinal: 26 November 1994 by Pope John Paul II
- Rank: Cardinal-Priest

Personal details
- Born: Pierre Étienne Louis Eyt; 4 June 1934 Laruns, Bayonne, French Third Republic
- Died: 11 June 2001 (aged 67) Bordeaux, France
- Parents: Jean Eyt; Joséphine Gabastou
- Education: Pontifical Gregorian University

Styles of Pierre Eyt
- Reference style: His Eminence
- Spoken style: Your Eminence
- Informal style: Cardinal
- See: Bordeaux

Pierre Étienne Louis Eyt S.T.D. (4 June 1934 – 11 June 2001) was a French cardinal of the Roman Catholic Church and Metropolitan Archbishop of Bordeaux and Bazas.

== Early life and priesthood ==
He was born in Laruns, France as the son of Jean Eyt and Josephine Gabastou. He was educated at the Institute of Juridical and Economic Studies in Pau, the Seminary of Pius XI, the Seminary of the Catholic Institute and at the Pontifical Gregorian University in Rome where he earned his doctorate in theology. He was ordained on 29 June 1961.

After his ordination he did pastoral work in the diocese of Bayonne from 1961 until 1963. He then worked as a faculty member and later vice-rector and then rector of the Catholic Institute of Toulouse and then rector of the Catholic Institute in Paris in 1981. He also served as a member of the International Theological Commission.

== Episcopate ==
Pope John Paul II appointed him coadjutor Archbishop of Bordeaux on 7 June 1986. He was consecrated on 28 September of that year by Marius Maziers who was assisted by Jean-Marie Lustiger then Archbishop of Paris, and by André Collini, archbishop of Toulouse. He succeeded to the Metropolitan see of Bordeaux on 31 May 1989.

== Cardinalate ==
He was created and proclaimed Cardinal-Priest of SS. Trinità al Monte Pincio in the consistory of 26 November 1994. He died on 11 June 2001 in Bordeaux and is buried at the cemetery of Laruns, where he was born.

Catholic Church titles
Preceded by Marius Maziers	Archbishop of Bordeaux; 31 May 1989 – 11 June 2001	Succeeded by Jean-Pierre Ricard
Preceded by Albert Decourtray	Cardinal Protector of SS. Trinità al Monte Pincio; 26 November 1994 – 11 June 2001	Succeeded by Louis-Marie Billé
