= Pierre du Chastel =

French humanist, librarian and bishop

Pierre du Chastel or Duchâtel (died 1552) was a French humanist, librarian to Francis I of France.

Pierre Duchâtel [Du Chastel, Castellanus, or Pierre Castellan], was born in Arc-en-Barrois around 1480, and was chaplain to King François I from 1537. He was also a scholar, bishop of Tulle (1544), of Mâcon (1549) and of Orléans (1551). He became also Master of the King's Bookshop, director of the Royal College (now Collège de France) and in 1548 was appointed Grand Almoner of France.

He died of apoplexy in Orléans on February 3, 1552 while preaching.
