= Charles du Plessis d'Argentré =

French Catholic theologian and bishop of Tulle

Charles du Plessis d'Argentré (16 May 1673 – 17 October 1740) was a French Catholic theologian and bishop of Tulle.

== Life ==
He entered the seminary of St. Sulpice at Paris, and studied theology at the Sorbonne; he was ordained priest in 1699, and was made Doctor of Theology in 1700. He held successively the offices of Abbé de Sainte Croix de Guingamp, Dean of Laval, Vicar-General of the Bishop of Tréguier (1707), and Royal Almoner. He was made Bishop of Tulle in 1723.

== Works ==
Among his writings were:

- "Analyse de la foi divine" (Paris, 1697);
- "Elementa Theologica" (Paris, 1702), in which he rejects papal infallibility but defends that of the Catholic Church in the matter of the condemned Jansenist propositions;
- "Lexicon Philosophicum" (Hague, 1706), a treatise on the difference between the natural and the supernatural order (Paris, 1707), "Explication des sacrements de l'eglise" (Tulle, 1734), and other theological, scriptural, and philosophical works.

He edited the theological works of Martin Grandin (Paris, 1710–12) and added several theological dissertations of his own, among them one on Pope Honorius. He is best known by his "Collectio Judiciorum de novis erroribus qui ab initio saec. XII [to 1735] in Ecclesia proscripti stint atque notati; Censoria etiam judicia academiarum", 3 vols. (Paris, 1724–36). This collection contains many documents relative to theological controversies since the twelfth century, pontifical "acta," decisions of Roman Congregations, and decisions of universities (Oxford, Paris, Douai, Louvain, principally those of Paris). The latest document quoted is dated 1723. There is a complete bibliography of his French and Latin works in the "Memoires de Trévoux" (1734), I, 223-225.
