= Guillaume Pellicier =

French prelate and diplomat

Guillaume Pellicier (also spelled Pellissier; c. 1490 – 1568) was a French prelate and diplomat.

== Life ==
Born at Melgueil in Languedoc, he was educated by his uncle, the bishop of Maguelonne, whom he succeeded in 1529. In 1536 he was transferred to Montpellier. While there he befriended Rabelais and other humanist intellectuals.

Francis I entrusted him with several important missions; in 1529 he accompanied Louise de Savoie to Cambrai and concluded peace with Charles V. In 1533 at Marseille he arranged with Clement VII for the marriage of the Duc d'Orléans (Henry II) and Catherine de' Medici. He obtained permission for the translation of his Episcopal see from Maguelonne to Montpellier from Paul III in 1536.

Appointed ambassador at Venice in 1539, he fulfilled his mission to the entire satisfaction of Francis I, and brought back a large number of Greek, Syriac, and Hebrew manuscripts. He hired scribes who copied at least 141 manuscripts themselves, while acquiring at least 39 others, many of which were extremely rare. On the discovery of the system of espionage he had employed, the king had to recall him in 1542. Returning to his diocese, he was imprisoned in the castle of Beaucaire for his tolerance of the Reformers, so he replaced his former indulgence by severity, and the end of his episcopate was disturbed by religious struggles. He was a man of wide learning, a humanist and a friend of humanists, and took a keen interest in the natural sciences.

== Bibliography ==
- Omont, Henri (1885). "Catalogue des manuscrits grecs de Guillaume Pelicier [premier article]". Bibliothèque de l'École des chartes. 46 (1): 45–83. doi:10.3406/bec.1885.447330.
- See J. Zeller,La Diplomatie française après le correspondance de G. Pellicier (Paris, 188f); and A. Tausserat-Radel, Correspondence politique de Guillaume Pellicier (Paris, 1899).
