= Norbert Turini =

French prelate

Norbert José Henri Turini
- Archbishop of Montpellier
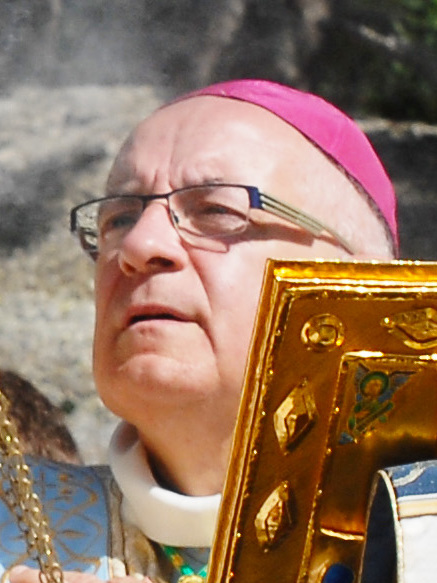
- Turini in 2016
- Church: Catholic Church
- Archdiocese: Archdiocese of Montpellier
- Appointed: 9 July 2022
- Predecessor: Pierre-Marie Carré
- Previous posts: Bishop of Perpignan-Elne (2014-2022); Bishop of Cahors (2004-2014)

Orders
- Ordination: 27 June 1982 by Jean Mouisset
- Consecration: 10 October 2004 by Émile Marcus

Personal details
- Born: 30 August 1954 (age 71) Cannes, Alpes-Maritimes, France
- Coat of arms

Norbert José Henri Turini (born 30 August 1954) is a French prelate of the Catholic Church who was named metropolitan archbishop of Montpellier in July 2022. He was bishop of Cahors from 2004 to 2014 and bishop of Perpignan-Elne from 2015 to 2022.

== Biography ==
Norbert Turini was born on 30 August 1954 in Cannes and studied at the Lycée Carnot there. He earned a degree in biology at the University of Nice and studied in the interdiocesan major seminary of Marseille, obtaining a licentiate in theology. He was ordained a priest of the Diocese of Nice on 27 June 1982.

He was adjunct to the Diocesan Service for Vocations from 1982 to 1986 and head of the Saint-Paul House for Christian students, the Diocesan Service for Vocations and the preparatory year in the Seminary from 1986 to 1996. He was Episcopal Vicar for Youth Ministry from 1996 to 2000. He was also parish administrator of Saint-Jean-Baptiste in Nice in 1999/2000. From 2000 to 2004 he was vicar general of Nice.

On 30 June 2004, Pope John Paul II appointed him bishop of Cahors. He received his episcopal consecration on 10 October from Émile Marcus, archbishop of Toulouse. In 2009 he joined a group of French bishops who criticized a Brazilian bishop for excommunicating a woman who arranged for her nine-year-old daughter, pregnant after being repeatedly raped by her stepfather, to have an abortion. He said: "We say it with all our strength, in this wounded world, we need to set forth attitudes of hope rather than hunker down in condemnations that run counter to the compassionate paths of merciful love." In a 2012 interview he said he was comfortable living with the French legal framework of laïcité, and that it made it crucial to build bridges while "the danger is in words that end in 'ism'". He counseled non-violent responses to religious insults suffered by Muslims and asked for a "peaceful debate" about same-sex marriage.

Pope Francis named him bishop of Perpignan-Elne on 18 October 2014. He was installed there on 18 January 2015. His work there focused on increasing the number of parish visits and the creation of several hundred prayer groups. In November 2020, he objected when the government limited the number of attendees at religious services to 30. He said the Church had been entirely supportive of the government's health measures during the COVID-19 pandemic, but called this limit "a profound injustice" and told his priests not to count attendees.

Pope Francis named him archbishop of Montpellier on 9 July 2022. Turini said he had expected to end his career in Perpignan, but declining the Montpellier title "would not be very evangelical".

His installation in Montpellier is scheduled for 23 October.

Within the French Episcopal Conference he was president of the Council for Communication from 2015 to 2021. He has been president of the Council for Interreligious Relations and New Religious Movements since 1 July 2022. He has also been general chaplain of the Maintenance des Pénitents of France and Monaco since 2018.
