= Bernard Louis Marie Charrier =

French Roman Catholic bishop (born 1938)

- Bishop Emeritus of Tulle
- Church: Catholic Church
- Diocese: Diocese of Tulle
- In office: 22 January 2001 – 12 December 2013
- Predecessor: Patrick Le Gal
- Successor: Francis Bestion
- Other post: Apostolic Administrator of Aire et Dax (2017)

Orders
- Ordination: 29 June 1964 by Jean Villepelet
- Consecration: 22 April 2001 by Georges Soubrier

Personal details
- Born: 4 August 1938 (age 88) Nantes, France

Bernard Louis Marie Charrier (born 4 August 1938 in Nantes) is a French Roman Catholic bishop.

Ordained to the priesthood on 29 June 1964, Charrier was named bishop of the Diocese of Tulle on 22 January 2001 and retired on 12 December 2013.
