= Diocese of Tulle =

Catholic diocese in France

Coordinates: 45°16′17″N 1°46′31″E

Diocese of Tulle Dioecesis Tutelensis Diocèse de Tulle

Catholic
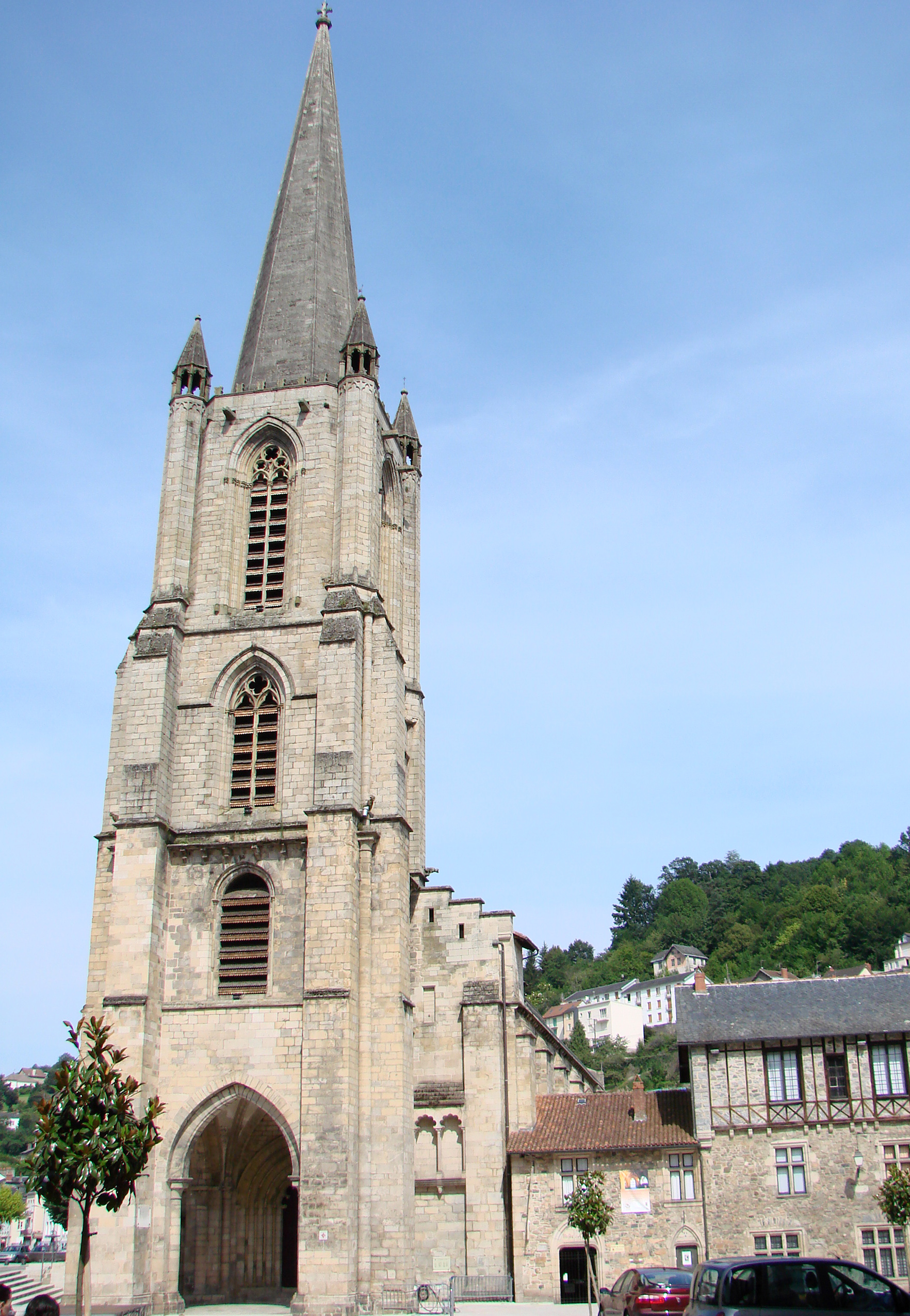
- Tulle Cathedral

Location
- Country: France
- Ecclesiastical province: Poitiers
- Metropolitan: Archdiocese of Poitiers

Statistics
- Area: 5,896 km^{2} (2,276 sq mi)
- Population: Total; Catholics: (as of 2022); 241,000; 221,000 (91.7%)
- Parishes: 296

Information
- Denomination: Catholic
- Sui iuris church: Latin Church
- Rite: Roman Rite
- Established: 11 July 1317
- Cathedral: Cathedral of Notre Dame and St. Martin
- Patron saint: Saint Martin of Tours
- Secular priests: 37 (Diocesan); 6 (Religious Orders); 10 Permanent Deacons

Current leadership
- Pope: Leo XIV
- Bishop designate: Éric Bidot
- Metropolitan Archbishop: Jérôme Daniel Beau
- Bishops emeritus: Bernard Louis Marie Charrier

Map

Website
- correze.catholique.fr

The Diocese of Tulle (Latin: Dioecesis Tutelensis; French: Diocèse de Tulle) is a Latin Church diocese of the Catholic Church in Tulle, France. The diocese of Tulle comprises the whole département of Corrèze.

The Abbey of Tulle was founded in the early 10th century. By the early 12th century, the abbot had established control over the pilgrimage church of Rocamadour. The abbacy was raised to a diocese in 1317, but suppressed by the Concordat of 1802, which joined it to the diocese of Limoges. In 1817, the diocese was re-established in principle, according to the terms of the Concordat of 1817, but was re-erected canonically only by the papal Bulls dated 6 and 31 October 1822, and made suffragan to the Archbishop of Bourges. Since the reorganization of French ecclesiastical provinces by Pope John Paul II on 8 December 2002, Tulle has been a suffragan of the Archdiocese of Poitiers.

In 2022, in the Diocese of Tulle there was one priest for every 5,139 Catholics.

== History ==
According to legends which arose in later years around the Saint Martial cycle, that saint, who had been sent by St. Peter to preach, is said to have restored to life at Tulle the son of the Roman governor, Nerva, and to have covered the neighbouring country with churches. The building of churches, however, was not possible until the fourth century.

Some legends name St. Martin of Tours as founder of the Abbey of Tulle, others St. Calmin, Count of Auvergne (seventh century). Robbed of its possessions by a powerful family, the Counts of Quercy, the abbey recovered them in 930 through the efforts of a member of the same family, Viscount Adhemar. Adhemar is recorded as count or viscount of Tulle between 898 and 935. Odo of Cluny, reformed the abbey in 928–929, along the lines of Cluny, where the abbot was elected by the monks, not provided by some powerful local family. The important pilgrimage shrine at Rocamadour was acquired by the abbey of Tulle, as confirmed by Pope Paschal II in 1105.

Pope John XXII by a Bull dated 13 August 1317, separated the Abbey of Tulle from the jurisdiction of the diocese of Limoges and raised it to episcopal rank; but the Chapter of the new cathedral continued to observe the Rule of St. Benedict, and was not transformed into a college of secular Canons until 1514. The Chapter dignitaries included: a Dean, a Provost, a Treasurer and a Cantor. The new Chapter of Secular Canons was authorized to have sixteen canons, and to create twelve choral vicars (which they were unable to do, because of financial constraints); by the eighteenth century there were only twelve canons. Abbot Arnaud of Tulle was named the first bishop of Tulle. Pope John also raised Tulle from the rank of a town to that of a city, and gave the Bishops of Tulle the title of Vicomte.

Among the bishops of Tulle were Hugues Roger, known as Cardinal de Tulle (1342–43), who was Bishop for only ten weeks, was never consecrated, and lived with his brother Clement VI in Avignon; Jean Fabri (1370–71), who became cardinal in 1371; Jules Mascaron, the preacher (1671–79), who was afterwards Bishop of Agen; Léonard Berteaud, preacher and theologian (1842–1878). By far the most important scholar to come from Tulle was Etienne Baluze, Aumonier to Louis XIV and Director of the Collège de France (1709–1710), author of Vitae Paparum Avenionensium (1693) and Historia Tutelensis (1716).

Pierre Roger, who became pope under the name of Clement VI, was a native of Maumont (now part of the commune of Rosiers-d'Égletons) in the diocese. In 1352 the papal Conclave chose Etienne Aubert, who became pope under the name Innocent VI, and who was a native of the hamlet of Les Monts (now part of the commune of Beyssac) in the Diocese of Tulle. In 1362 Hugues Roger, called the Cardinal of Tulle, brother of Clement VI, refused the papacy; in 1370 Pierre Roger de Beaufort, his nephew, became pope under the name of Gregory XI.

At Tulle and in Bas (Lower) Limousin, every year, on the vigil of St. John the Baptist, a feast is kept which is known as le tour de la lunade (the change of the moon); it is a curious example of the manner in which the Church was able to sanctify and Christianize many pagan customs. Legend places the institution of this feast in 1346 or 1348, about the time of the Black Death. It would seem to have been the result of a vow made in honour of St. John the Baptist. Maximin Deloche, a native of Tulle, has argued however that the worship of the sun existed in Gaul down to the seventh century, according to the testimony of St. Eligius, and that the feast of St. John's Nativity, 24 June, was substituted for the pagan festival of the summer solstice, so that the tour de la lunade was an old pagan custom, sanctified by the Church, which changed it to an act of homage to St. John the Baptist.

=== French Revolution ===
The diocese of Tulle was abolished during the French Revolution by the Legislative Assembly, under the Civil Constitution of the Clergy (1790). Its territory was subsumed into the new diocese, called the 'Corrèze', which was part of the Metropolitanate called the 'Metropole de Sud-Ouest (which included ten new 'departements'). The electors of 'Corrèze' met at Tulle beginning on 20 February 1791, and after two days of deliberations elected Jean-Jacques Brivel, a 65 year old former Jesuit and the uncle of the Procurator-Syndic of Corrèzes. He was consecrated in Paris at the Oratory on 13 March 1791 by Constitutional Bishops Saurine (Landes), Lindet and Laurent. The consecration was valid, but it was illicit and schismatic; no bulls of consecration had been issued by Pope Pius VI. In Corrèzes only forty priests who had taken the Oath to the Constitution had to serve 320 parishes.

In 1791 the Cathedral of Tulle was occupied by troops of the Revolution, who set up a manufactory for weapons in one transept. In 1796 the cupola and crossing of the transept fell, and the Choir and Transept were torn down. The ancient sculpture had been destroyed during the Terror.

On 27 November 1793 the enthusiasts of the Terror to the number of 2000 swept through Tulle, destroying everything connected with religion they could find, and the Constitutional Bishop fled. Bishop Brivel was absent for sixteen months, and when he returned he remained inactive. He died at Tulle on 18 January 1802, after having retracted his oath and confessed his errors.

== Saints and pilgrimages ==
St. Rodolphe of Turenne, Archbishop of Bourges (died in 866) founded, about 855, the Abbey of Beaulieu in the Diocese of Tulle. The Charterhouse of Glandier dates from 1219; the Benedictine Abbey of Uzerche was founded between 958 and 991; Meymac Priory, which became an abbey in 1146, was founded by Archambaud III, Viscount of Conborn.

St. Anthony of Padua lived for several days at Brive, towards the end of October, 1226; and the pilgrimage to the Grotto of Brive is the only existing one in France in his honour. Other saints connected with the diocese are: St. Fereola, martyr (date uncertain); St. Martin of Brive, disciple of St. Martin of Tours, and martyr (fifth century); St. Duminus, hermit (early sixth century); at Argentat, St. Sacerdos, who was Bishop of Limoges when he retired into solitude (sixth century); St. Vincentianus (St. Viance), hermit (seventh century); St. Liberalis, Bishop of Embrun, died in 940 at Brive, his native place; St. Reynier, provost of Beaulieu, died at the beginning of the tenth century; St. Stephen of Obazine, b. about 1085, founder of the monastery for men at Obazine, and of that for women at Coyroux; St. Berthold of Malefayde, first general of the Carmelites, and whose brother Aymeric was Latin Patriarch of Antioch (twelfth century). The missionary Dumoulin Borie (1808–1838), who was martyred in Tonquin, was born in the diocese.

The chief pilgrimages of the diocese are: Notre-Dame-de-Belpeuch, at Camps, dating from the ninth or tenth century; Notre-Dame-de-Chastre at Bar, dating from the seventeenth century; Notre-Dame-du-Pont-du-Salut, which goes back to the seventeenth century; Notre-Dame-du-Roc at Servières, dating from 1691; Notre-Dame-d'Eygurande, dating from 1720; Notre-Dame-de-La-Buissière-Lestard, which was a place of pilgrimage before the seventeenth century; Notre-Dame-de-La-Chabanne at Ussel, dates from 1140; Notre-Dame-de-Pennacorn at Neuvic, dating from the end of the fifteenth century.

== Abbots of Tulle ==
- Bernard I (d. 969)
- Géraud I (d. 979)
- Adémar (fl. 984)
- Bernard II (c. 994 – 17 November 1028)
- Pierre I (fl. 1031×1037)
- Bernard III (1037–1055)
- Bernard IV (fl. 1059)
- Fruin (c. 1070 – 1085)
- Gausbert (1085–1091)
- Robert de Montbron (1091–1092)
- Guillaume de Carbonnières (1092–1111/2)
- Ebles de Turenne (1112 – 6/7 November 1152)
- Géraud II d'Escorailles (1152 – 12 December 1188)
- Bernard V (fl. 1191–1193)
- Bertrand (fl. 1209)
- Bernard VI de Ventadour (1210–1235)
- Elie de Ventadour (1237–1241)
- Pierre II de Vart de Malemort (1241–1276)
- Pierre III de Coral (28 August 1276 – 1285/6)
- Raymond de Terrasson (September 1286 – 6 October 1305)
- Arnaud de Saint-Astier (9 March 1307 – 18 August 1317)

== Bishops of Tulle ==
=== 1317 to 1400 ===
- Arnaud de Saint-Astier (18 August 1317 – 1333)
- Arnaud de Clermont, O.Min. (10 September 1333 – 1337)
- Hugues Roger, O.S.B. (18 July 1342 – 25 September 1342)
- Guy (25 September 1342 – 1344)
- Bertrand de la Tour (1 October 1344 – 1346) (transferred to St.-Papoul)
- Pierre d'Aigrefeuille (19 February 1347 – 24 October 1347) (transferred to Vabres)
- Archambaud (11 February 1348 – 26 February 1361)
- Laurence d'Albiars (or d'Albiac/Aubiac) (25 October 1361 – 1369) (transferred from Vaison)
- Jean Lefevre (8 August 1369 – 30 May 1371) (promoted Cardinal Priest of San Marcello)
- Bertrand de Cosnac de Maumont (4 July 1371 – 9 July 1376) (transferred to Poitiers)
- Bernardus (30 January 1376 – 1376)
- Pierre de Cosnac (27 August 1376 – 1407)

=== 1400 to 1500 ===
- Bertrand de Botinand (13 September 1407 – 1416) (appointed by Benedict XIII of the Avignon Obedience.
- Hugues Combarel(li) (29 November 1419 – 12 January 1422) (transferred to Béziers) (appointed by John XXIII of the Pisan Avignon-Roman Obedience)
- Bertrand de Maumont (12 January 1422 – 1426) (transferred from Béziers)
- Jean de Cluys (6 February 1426 – 9 June 1444)
- Pierre Comborn (named by Pope Eugenius IV, but never granted the temporalities by the King of France)
- Hugues d'Aubusson (15 June 1451 – September 1454)
- Louis d'Aubusson, O.S.B. (17 December 1455 – September 1471)
- Denis de Bar (20 November 1471 – 1495) (transferred to St. Papoul)
- Clément de Brillac (9 March 1495 – 21 September 1514)

=== 1500 to 1800 ===
- François de Lévis (11 December 1514 – 1530)
- Jacques Amelin (15 January 1531 – May 1539)
- Pierre du Chastel [Castellanus] (16 June 1539 – 1544) (transferred to Macon)
- François de Faucon (2 April 1544 – 1551) (transferred to Orleans)
- Jean de Fonsec (4 March 1551 – 1560)
- Louis de Genoillac [Senollhac] (17 July 1560 – 1580)
- Flotard Genoillac de Gourden (8 June 1582 – March 1586)
- Antoine de la Tour (20 April 1587 – 12 September 1594)
- [Jean de Visandon] (nominated in 1594, but never received papal approval and was never consecrated)
- Jean Ricard de Gourdon de Genouillac (8 November 1599 – 1652)
- Louis de Rechingevoisin de Guron (26 May 1653 – 1671/1672)
- Jules Mascaron (21 March 1672 – 1679) (Appointed Bishop of Agen)
- Humbert Ancelin (17 March 1681 – 1702)
- André-Daniel de Beaupoil de Saint-Aulaire (25 September 1702 – 8 September 1720)
- Louis-Jacques Chapt de Rastignac (29 Dec 1721 Appointed – 26 Oct 1723 Appointed, Archbishop of Tours)
- Charles du Plessis d'Argentré (26 Oct 1723 Appointed – 27 Oct 1740 Died)
- François de Beaumont d'Autichamp (20 December 1741 – 20 November 1761)
- Henri Joseph Claudius de Bourdeille (22 November 1762 – 17 December 1764) (transferred to Soissons)
- Charles Joseph Marie de Raffélis de Saint-Sauveur (17 December 1764 – 28 April 1791)
  - Jean Jacques Brival (1791 – 18 January 1802) (Constitutional Bishop of Corrèze)

=== since 1800 ===
- Claude-Joseph-Judith-François-Xavier de Sagey (13 January 1823 – 1824 Resigned)
- Augustin de Mailhet de Vachères (13 October 1824 – 16 May 1842 Died)
- Jean-Baptiste-Pierre-Léonard Berteaud (15 June 1842 – 3 September 1878 Retired)
- Henri-Charles-Dominique Denéchau (15 October 1878 – 18 April 1908 Died)
- Albert Nègre (14 July 1908 – 5 August 1913) (transferred to Archbishop of Tours)
- Joseph-Marie-François-Xavier Métreau (6 August 1913 – 24 April 1918 Died)
- Jean Castel (3 August 1918 – 8 October 1939 Died)
- Aimable Chassaigne (6 February 1940 – 23 January 1962 Retired)
- Marcel-François Lefebvre, C.S.Sp., S.S.P.X., Archbishop (personal title) (23 January 1962 Appointed – 11 August 1962 Resigned)
- Henri Clément Victor Donze (15 November 1962 Appointed – 12 February 1970) (Appointed Bishop of Tarbes et Lourdes)
- Jean-Baptiste Brunon, P.S.S. (4 April 1970 Appointed – 28 April 1984 Resigned)
- Roger Marie Albert Froment (20 June 1985 Appointed – 22 October 1996 Resigned)
- Patrick Le Gal (12 September 1997 Appointed – 23 May 2000 Appointed, Bishop of France, Military)
- Bernard Louis Marie Charrier (22 January 2001 Appointed – 12 December 2013 Retired )
- Francis Bestion (12 December 2013 – 1 October 2024)
- Éric Bidot, OFM Cap (15 April 2025 – present)

== Bibliography ==
=== Reference works ===
- Gams, Pius Bonifatius (1873). Series episcoporum Ecclesiae catholicae: quotquot innotuerunt a beato Petro apostolo. Ratisbon: Typis et Sumptibus Georgii Josephi Manz. pp. 644–645. (Use with caution; obsolete)
- Jean, Armand (1891). Les évêques et les archevêques de France depuis 1682 jusqu'à 1801 (in French). Paris: A. Picard.
- Eubel, Conradus, ed. (1913). Hierarchia catholica, Tomus 1 (second ed.). Münster: Libreria Regensbergiana. (in Latin) p. 505.
- Eubel, Conradus, ed. (1914). Hierarchia catholica, Tomus 2 (second ed.). Münster: Libreria Regensbergiana. (in Latin) p. 259.
- Eubel, Conradus; Gulik, Guilelmus, eds. (1923). Hierarchia catholica, Tomus 3 (second ed.). Münster: Libreria Regensbergiana. p. 322.
- Gauchat, Patritius (Patrice) (1935). Hierarchia catholica IV (1592-1667). Münster: Libraria Regensbergiana. p. 351.
- Ritzler, Remigius; Sefrin, Pirminus (1952). Hierarchia catholica medii et recentis aevi V (1667-1730). Patavii: Messagero di S. Antonio. p. 396.
- Ritzler, Remigius; Sefrin, Pirminus (1958). Hierarchia catholica medii et recentis aevi VI (1730-1799). Patavii: Messagero di S. Antonio. p. 423.

=== Studies ===
- Baluze, Étienne (1717). Historiae Tutelensis libri tres, auctore Stephano Baluzio Tutelensi (in Latin). Paris: Typographia Regia.
- Bertry, Louis (1900). Histoire de la ville de Tulle (in French). Tulle: Mazeyrie.
- Ducreux, Francis (1986). Le Chapitre cathédral de Tulle: de ses origines à la Révolution française (in French). Tulle: Impr. Maugein.
- René Fage (1889). Le Diocèse de la Corrèze pendant la Révolution: 1791-1801 ... (in French). Tulle: Imprimerie Crauffon.
- Gasmand, Marion (2007). Les évêques de la province ecclésiastique de Bourges: milieu Xe-fin XIe siècle (in French). Paris: Connaissances et Savoirs. ISBN 978-2-7539-0022-6.
- Rupin, Ernest (1878). "Notice historique sur les Évèques de Tulle," Bulletin de la Société scientifique, historique et archéologique de la Corrèze (in French). Vol. Tome I. Brive: M. Riche, impr. 1878. pp. 493–498, 699–708.
- Rupin, Ernest (1880). "Notice historique sur les Évèques de Tulle," Bulletin de la Société scientifique, historique et archéologique de la Corrèze (in French). Vol. Tome II. Brive: M. Riche, impr. 1880. pp. 109–120, 369–380.
- Rupin, Ernest (1904). Roc-Amadour: Étude historique et archéologique. Librairie G. Baranger Fils.
- Sainte-Marthe (OSB), Denis de (1720). Gallia Christiana, In Provincias Ecclesiasticas Distributa (in Latin). Vol. Tomus secundus (Provinces of Bourges and Bordeaux). Paris: Ex Typographia Regia. pp. 662–684, Instrumenta, pp. 203–220.
- Salviat, Paul; Quincy, Gilles (1991). La Cathédrale de Tulle aux XVIIe et XVIIIe siècles: nouveaux aperçus d'après des documents inédits (in French). Tulle: Lemouzi.

== See also ==
- Goyau, Georges. "Tulle." The Catholic Encyclopedia. Vol. 15. New York: Robert Appleton Company, 1912. Retrieved: 2016-09-17.
