= Marius Maziers =

French bishop

His Excellency Marius-Félix-Antoine Maziers
- Archbishop of Bordeaux
- Church: Roman Catholic Church
- See: Archdiocese of Bordeaux
- In office: 1968–1989
- Predecessor: Paul-Marie-André Richaud
- Successor: Pierre Étienne Louis Eyt
- Previous post: Bishop

Orders
- Ordination: 9 October 1938

Personal details
- Born: 1 March 1915 Siran, France
- Died: 14 August 2008 (aged 93) Mauriac, France

Marius-Félix-Antoine Maziers (1 March 1915 – 14 August 2008) was a French Bishop of the Catholic Church.

Marius Maziers was born in Siran, France, raised in the Roman Catholic faith and was ordained a priest on 9 October 1938. On 17 December 1959, he was appointed Titular Bishop of Augustopolis in Phrygia and auxiliary bishop of Archdiocese of Lyon and was consecrated on 25 February 1960. He was appointed Coadjutor Archbishop of the Bordeaux and Titular Bishop of Zica. He succeeded to the post of Archbishop of Bordeaux with the death of his predecessor on 6 February 1968 and served until his retirement on 31 May 1989.

Archbishop Maziers died on 14 August 2008 at the age of 93.

== See also ==
- Archdiocese of Bordeaux
- Archdiocese of Lyon
