= Diocese of Perpignan-Elne =

Catholic diocese in France

Diocese of Perpignan–Elne Dioecesis Elnensis: Diocèse de Perpignan–Elne; Bisbat de Perpinyà–Elna

Catholic
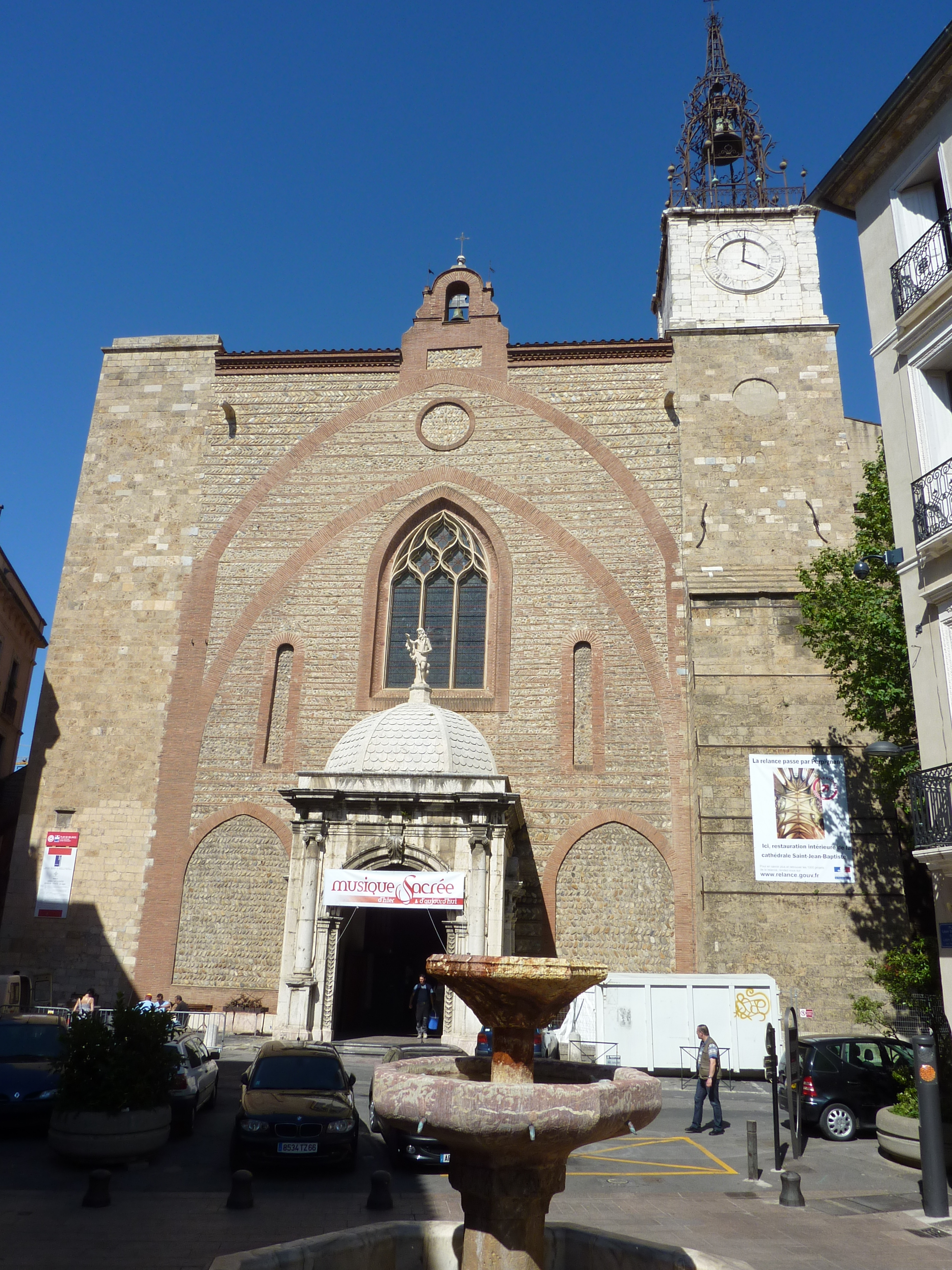
- Perpignan Cathedral

Location
- Country: France
- Ecclesiastical province: Montpellier
- Metropolitan: Archdiocese of Montpellier

Statistics
- Area: 4,143 km^{2} (1,600 sq mi)
- Population: Total; Catholics: (as of 2023); 484,215 ▲; 316,800 (est.) ▲
- Parishes: 231

Information
- Denomination: Roman Catholic
- Sui iuris church: Latin Church
- Rite: Roman Rite
- Established: 6 October 1822
- Cathedral: Cathedral Basilica of St. John the Baptist in Perpignan
- Co-cathedral: Co-Cathedral of St. Eulalia and St. Julia in Elne
- Patron saint: Saint John the Baptist; Saint Eulalia; Saint Julia
- Secular priests: 54 (Diocesan) ▼13 (Religious Orders) ▲23 Permanent Deacons

Current leadership
- Pope: Leo XIV
- Bishop: Thierry Scherrer
- Metropolitan Archbishop: Norbert Turini

Map

Website
- Website of the Diocese

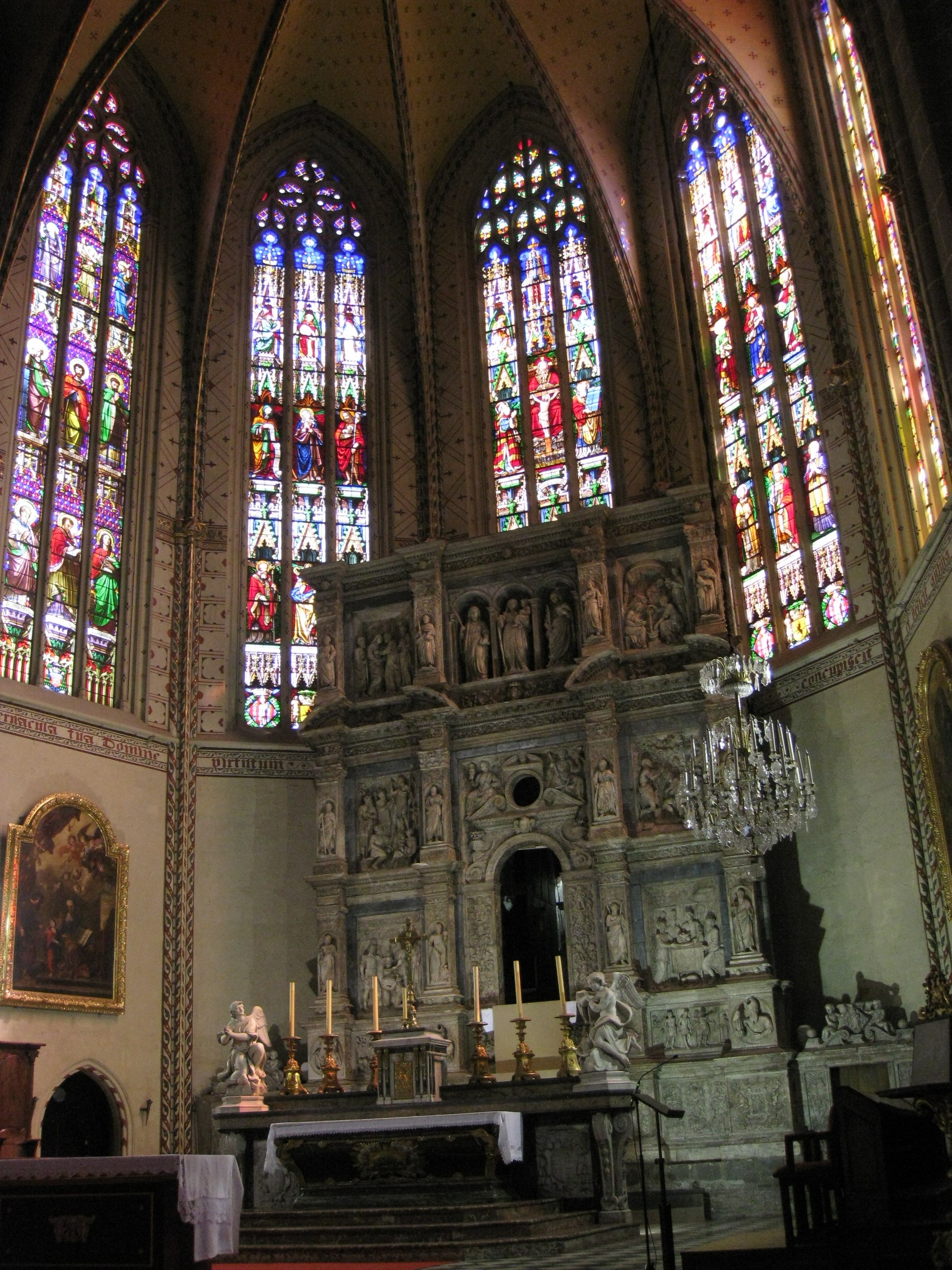
High altar of Perpignan Cathedral

The Diocese of Perpignan–Elne (Latin: Dioecesis Elnensis; French: Diocèse de Perpignan–Elne; Catalan: Bisbat de Perpinyà–Elna) is a Latin diocese of the Catholic Church in France. The diocese comprises the Department of Pyrénées-Orientales.

The Diocese of Elne was a suffragan of the Diocese of Narbonne until 1511. Pope Julius II made the Diocese of Elne directly subject to the Holy See in 1511, but on 22 January 1517 Pope Leo X reversed the policy, and the Diocese of Elne became again a suffragan of the Diocese of Narbonne. In 1582, by virtue of a Decree of the Council of Trent, Pope Gregory XIII made it a suffragan of the Archdiocese of Tarragona. After 1678 it was again a suffragan of the Diocese of Narbonne.

The residence of the bishop of Elne and the seat of the diocese were moved from Elne to Perpignan, by Pope Clement VIII in 1601. Its territory brought together the Diocese of Elne, part of the Spanish Diocese of Urgell known as French Cerdagne, three cantons of the Diocese of Alet, and two villages of the Diocese of Narbonne.

Its see is the Perpignan Cathedral (French: Basilique-Cathédrale de Saint-Jean-Baptiste de Perpignan; Catalan: Catedral de Sant Joan Baptista de Perpinyà).

== History ==
The Diocese of Elne was created in the 6th century. The first known Bishop of Elne was Dominus, mentioned in 571 in the Chronicle of John of Biclarum. The diocese of Elne was a suffragan of the diocese of Narbonne.

The Cathedral of Elne (eleventh century) and the adjoining cloister are examples of elaborate medieval ornamentation. On 16 May 1025, the old church of Saint-Jean in Perpignan was consecrated by Bishop Berengarius (III). On 13 July 1287, Bishop Berengarius fixed the number of canons in the cathedral Chapter of Elne at fifteen.

In the later Middle Ages, and under the influence of Roman Law, Roussillon witnessed revivals of slavery; this is proved by numerous purchase deeds of Muslim and Christian slaves, dating back to the fourteenth and fifteenth centuries.

On 3 June 1494, Caesar Borgia was named Abbot commendatory of the monastery of S. Michel de Cuxa in the diocese of Elne, by his father Pope Alexander VI. On 3 April 1495, the bishopric of Elne became vacant, and Caesar was immediately named Administrator, not being in episcopal orders. He took possession by procurator on 1 June 1495. He decided to raise the taxes on the clergy, resulting in an uprising in 1497. Those same taxes were cut in half the following year, after the clergy complained to the king. On 9 March 1499, Saint-Michel de Cuxa was in different hands, and by November 1499 there was a new bishop of Elne.

=== Council of Perpignan ===
At Perpignan Pope Benedict XIII (Pedro de Luna) held a council, set to open on 1 November 1408, to rally his partisans. They gradually melted away and on 1 February 1409, the eighteen remaining bishops advised the antipope to send ambassadors to Pisa to negotiate with Pope Gregory XII. The last actual meeting of the council took place on 26 March 1409, though it was not closed, only repeatedly prorogued.

=== Synods ===
A synod was held at Toulanges (in prato Tulujes) in the diocese of Elne, on 16 May 1027, presided over by Bishop Oliva of Vich, because Bishop Berenguer (1019–1030) was at the time a pilgrim in foreign parts (tunc temporis in transmarinis partibus peregrini). The synod decided to impose a ban on fighting between the 9th hour on Saturday until the first hour of Monday, under penalty of excommunication; and ordered that Holy Mass be said for the excommunicated for a space of three months, to obtain their return to communion.

Another synod was held in 1058. On 2 January 1114, by mandate of Pope Paschal II, and presided over by Bishop Petrus Bernardi of Elne with the assistance of Bishop Berengarius of Gerona and Bishop Gualterius of Maguelonne, a judicial assembly was held to decide the claims of the monastery of Cuxa and the monastery of Arulena. Synods were also held in 1335, 1337, 1338, 1339, 1340, and 1380.

Bihop Philippe-Olympe Gerbet (1853–1864) held a diocesan synod of Elne on 25–29 September 1853, and published the statutes. A diocesan synod was held in Elne in September 1893.

=== Move of episcopal residence from Elne to Perpignan ===
In 1230, the bishops of Elne had appropriated the revenues of the major chaplaincy of the church of Saint-Jean in Perepignan, and thereafter resided from time to time in the cloister of that church. From 1389, they began to petition the papacy for permission to move their residence from Elne to the collegiate church of Saint-Jean, though they were regularly rebuffed.

By the end of the 16th century the city of Elne had become severely run-down. It was victim both of attacks from Protestant neighbors and from sea raiders. The nobility and leading citizens as well as some of the canons of the cathedral had moved long since, and only the working class remained, amounting to no more than 240 families (domos). King Philip III of Spain, who was also prince of Catalonia and count of Roussillon and Cerdanya, and the bishop of Elne along with the canons of Elne and of Perpignan, approached Pope Clement VIII with the desirability of moving to the fortified city of Perpignan, which was farther from the sea and was the center of local royal government, and yet only six miles from Elne.

On 1 September 1601, therefore, Pope Clement VIII issued the bull "Superna dispositione," agreeing to the move of the episcopal seat of Elne to the church of S. Jean in Perpignan. The canons of the cathedral of Elne were also moved to Perpignan. The name of the diocese and the title of the bishop, however, were not changed. As late as the 1890s, it was the bishop of Elne who held a synod of the diocese of Elne.

At the time of the French Revolution, the city of Perpignan was host to twelve religious orders of males. In 1723, the Augustinians had 14 members, but in 1789 only 7. The Discalced Augustinians in the same period had declined from 14 to 10, and the Carmelites from 12 to 5. The Capuchins had decline from 10 to 4, and their convent was demolished during the Revolution. The Franciscans dropped from 24 to 6, the Minims from 12 to 5, the Dominicans from 20 to 6. The Jesuits, who had been in the diocese of Elne since 1601, had been expelled from France in 1762. There were four institutions for women: the convent of Saint-Claire with 26 residents, the 15 canonesses of Saint-Saveur, the 15 Dominican sisters, and the 20 Benedictine nuns of the congregation of Béziers.

=== French Roussilon ===
A French army occupied Rousillon in 1642, and King Louis XIII immediately began making changes in ecclesiastical appointments. On 7 November 1659, the Peace of the Pyrenees, negotiated by Cardinal Mazarin and Don Luis de Haro, granted France permanent possession of Artois, Roussilon, and a part of Cerdagne. The territory of the diocese of Elne became part of the Kingdom of France.

The conquests under Louis XIV brought ecclesiastical problems. The Concordat of Bologna (1516) between Francis I of France and Pope Leo X had granted the kings of France the right to nominate candidates for vacant French bishoprics and certain other benefices, provided that the nomination was made within six months and that the candidate was suitable for the position. The annexation of Lorraine required that the pope make additional provision for the "Three Bishoprics," Metz, Toul, and Verdun, and therefore Pope Alexander VII issued the apostolic brief "Orthodoxae fidei" on 11 December 1664. When Roussilon was annexed, Pope Clement IX issued the apostolic brief, "Praeclara majestatis," on 9 April 1668, granting King Louis and his successors the jurispatronatus and right of presentation of the diocese of Elne.

In 1685, Bishop Louis Habert de Montmort (1682–1695) announced plans for a seminary in Perpignan, which opened in the bishop's palace in 1688. The seminary serviced around fifty students, and was administered by diocesan priests. On 5 April 1688, the bishop signed a contract with the Jesuits, to whom he handed over the administration of the seminary. The king provided a subsidy for 19 seminarians to study for ten months out of the year.

=== French Revolution ===
On 2 November 1789, the French National Assembly proclaimed that all ecclesiastical property in France was confiscated by the State.

Even before it directed its attention to the Church directly, the National Constituent Assembly attacked the institution of monasticism. On 13 February 1790. it issued a decree which stated that the government would no longer recognize solemn religious vows taken by either men or women. In consequence, Orders and Congregations which lived under a Rule were suppressed in France. Members of either sex were free to leave their monasteries or convents if they wished, and could claim an appropriate pension by applying to the local municipal authority.

The National Constituent Assembly ordered the replacement of political subdivisions of the ancien régime with subdivisions called "departments", to be characterized by a single administrative city in the center of a compact area. The decree was passed on 22 December 1789, and the boundaries fixed on 26 February 1790, with the effective date of 4 March 1790. A new department was created, called "Pyrénées-Orientales", and its administrative center was fixed at Perpignan.

The National Constituent Assembly then, on 6 February 1790, instructed its ecclesiastical committee to prepare a plan for the reorganization of the clergy. At the end of May, its work was presented as a draft Civil Constitution of the Clergy, which, after vigorous debate, was approved on 12 July 1790. There was to be one diocese in each department, requiring the suppression of approximately fifty dioceses. The seat of the diocese of Pyrénées-Orientales was fixed at Perpignan. The old ecclesiastical provinces were abolished, and ten new "metropolitanates" were created. The diocese of Pyrénées-Orientales (formerly Elne) was assigned to the Metropole du Sud, whose metropolitan was seated at Toulouse.

The Civil Constitution of the Clergy also abolished Chapters, canonries, prebends, and other offices both in cathedrals and in collegiate churches.

=== Restoration ===
The French Directory fell in the coup engineered by Talleyrand and Napoleon on 10 November 1799. The coup resulted in the establishment of the French Consulate, with Napoleon as the First Consul. To advance his aggressive military foreign policy, he decided to make peace with the Catholic Church in France and with the Papacy. In the concordat of 1801 with Pope Pius VII, and in the enabling papal bull, "Qui Christi Domini", the constitutional diocese of Pyrénées-Orientales and all the other dioceses in France, were suppressed. This removed all the institutional contaminations and novelties introduced by the Constitutional Church, and voided all of the episcopal appointments of both authentic and constitutional bishops.

In the Concordat of 1801, in the new circumscription of archbishoprics and suffragans, the department of Pyrénées-Orientales and the department of l'Aude were assigned to the restored Diocese of Carcassonne. In the bull "qui Christi domini" (29 November 1801), Pope Pius VII authorized the new circumscription, which did not include the diocese of Elne.

The rearrangement of national borders by the Congress of Vienna, following the defeat of Napoleon, and the changes of regimes, required the negotiating or re-negotiating of concordats. The restoration of the Bourbon kings in France resulted in a treaty between Louis XVIII and Pope Pius VII, the Concordat of 11 June 1817. The diocese of Elne was to be reestablished through the bull "Commissa divinitus", as a suffragan of Narbonne, but the French Parliament did not approve the treaty. It was not until 6 October 1822 that a revised version of the papal bull, "Paternae Charitatis," received the approval of all parties.

In preparing a revised version of "Commissa divinitus", it was realized, at an advanced stage of the drafting, that there were an excessive number of metropolitanates in the Rhone valley, in particular Arles, Vienne and Narbonne, and that some consolidation was in order. The ecclesiastical province and the diocese of Narbonne were not revived, and on 6 October 1822 the diocese of Elne was reassigned to the ecclesiastical province of Albi. On 8 December 2002, Albi ceased to be a metropolitan archbishopric, and became instead a suffragan of Toulouse. The diocese of Elne became a suffragan of the archdiocese of Montpellier.

==== Pilgrimages ====
The chief places of pilgrimage of the diocese are: Notre-Dame du Château d'Ultréra, at Sorède; Notre-Dame de Consolation, at Collioure; Notre-Dame de Font Romeu, at Odeillo; Notre-Dame de Forca-Réal, near Millas; Notre-Dame de Juigues, near Rivesaltes; and the relics of Sts. Abdon and Sennen at Arles on the Tech.

The diocese of Perpignan-Elne maintains a web page with information about pilgrimages. There is also a list of current pilgrimages of the year 2025, featured diocesan pilgrimages to Lourdes and to Rome (Jubilee 2025).

== Bishops ==
=== To 1000 ===
- (c. 571) : Domnus
- (c. 589) : Benenatus
- (c. 633 to 638) : Acutulus
- (c. 656) : Witaricus
- (c. 673) Hyacinthius
- (c. 683) Clarus

[ (788) : Wenedurius]

- (825–826) : Ramnon
- (c. 834–836) : Salomó (Fulmo)
- (852–885) : Audesindus
- (885–915?) : Riculf (I)
- (916?–920) : Almeraldus (Elmerald, Elmerat)
- (920–947) : Wadaldus (Guadaldus de Empuries-Rosselló)
- (947–966) : Riculf (II)
- (967–977) : Suniarius (I)
- (979–991) : Hildesindus
- (993–994) : Berenguer de Cerdanya-Besalú
- (994–999) : Fredelo
- (999–1003) : Berenguer de Cerdanya-Besalú (second time)

=== 1000 to 1300 ===
- (1003–1007) : Fredelo (second time)
- (1009–1014) : Oliva de Besora
- (1019–1030) : Berenguer de Sendred de Gurb (1019–1030)
- (1031) : Suniari (II.)
- (1032–1053) : Berenguer (IV.)
- (1054–1061) : Artal (I.)
- (1062) : Suniari (III)
- (1064–1086) : Ramon (I.)
- (1087–1096) : Artal (II.)
- (1097–1111) : Armengol
- (1113–1129) : Petrus Bernardi (Pere Bernat)
- (1130–1147) : Udalgà de Castellnou
- (1148–1171) : Artal (III.)
- (1172–1186) : Guillem Jordà
- (1187) : Berenguer (V.)
- (1187–1197) : Guillem de Céret
- (1200–1201) : Artal (IV.)
- (1202–1209) : Guillem de Ortafa
- (1212–1216) : Ramon de Vilallonga
- (1217–1221) : Gualter
- (1223–1224) : Arnald de Serrallonga
- (1225–1229) : Ramon (III.)
- (1230–1259) : Bernat de Berga
- (1259–1280) : Berenguer de Cantallops
- (1280–1281) : Bernat de Sala
- (1282–1289) : Berenguer de Sainte-Foi
- (1289–1310) : Ramon de Costa

=== 1300 to 1500 ===
- (1311–1312) : Raimundus Costa
- (1313–1317) : Guillerm de Castelló, O.S.B.
- (1317–1320) : Berenguer d'Argilaguers
- (1320–1332) : Berenguer Batlle
- (1332–1342) : Guido de Terrena
- (1342–1346) : Pere Seguier
- (1347–1348) : Bernat Hug de Santa Artèmia
- (1348–1350) : Bernat Fournier
- (1350–1351) : Estebe Malet
- (1352–1354) : Francesc de Montoliu
- (1354–1357) : Jean Jouffroi
- (1357–1361) : Raymond de Salgues
- (1361–1371) : Petrus de Planella
- (1371–1377) : Petrus de Cima, O.Min. (Pere Cima)
- (1377–1380) : Raimundus d'Escales Avignon Obedience
- (1380–1384) : Dalmatius (Dalmaci) Avignon Obedience
- (1384–1408) : Bartholomeus Peyroni, O.Carm. Avignon Obedience
- (1408) : Raymond de Castella Avignon Obedience
- (1408–1409) : (Francisco Ximenes), O. Min. Avignon Obedience
- (1409–1410) : Alphonsus de Tous Avignon Obedience
- (1410–1425) : Jerònim d'Ocó
- (1425–1431) : Joan de Casanova
- (1431–1453) : Galcerà d'Albert
- (1453–1462) : Joan de Margarit
- (1462–1467) : Antoni de Cardona
- (1468–1470) : Joan Pintor
- (1470–1473) : Charles de Saint-Gelais
- (1475–1494) : Charles de Martigny

(1494–1495) : Ascanio Maria Sforza Administrator

- (1495–1498) : Cesar Borja (Bishop-elect; never consecrated)
- (1499–1506) : Francisco Lloris y de Borja

=== From 1500 ===
- (1506–1513) : Santiago de Serra y Cau
- (1513–1515) : Juan Castellanos de Villalba
- (1517–1524) : Bernardo de Mesa, O.P.
- (1524–1529) : Guillermo Valdenese
- (1529–1530) : Fernando Valdés (transferred to Orense)
- (1530–1532) : Cardinal Girolamo Doria (Administrator)
- (1534–1537) : Jaime de Rich, O.S.B.
- (1537–1542) : Jeronimo de Requesens
- (1542–1543) : Fernando de Loaces y Pérez, O.P.
- (1543–1545) : Pedro Agustín
- (1545–1555) : Miguel Despuig
- (1555–1558) : Rafael Ubach
- (1558–1567) : Lope Martínez de Lagunilla
- (1568–1578) : Pedro Martir Coma, O.P.
- (1579–1586) : Joan Terès i Borrull
- (1586–1588) : Pedro Bonet de Santa María
- (1588) : Agustín Gaillart, O.S.B.
- (1588) : Luis de Sans i Codol
- (1589–1598) : Fernando de Valdés Salas (later Bishop of Vic)
- (1599–1608) : Onofre Reart

== Bishops of Elne, residing at Perpignan ==
=== From 1601 to 1801 ===
- Joan de Palau
- (1609–1612) : Antonio Gallart y Traginer
- (1613–1616) : Francisco de Vera Villavicencio, O. de la Merced
- (1617) : Federico Cornet
- (1617–1618) : Ramón Ivorra
- (1618–1620) : Rafael Ripoz, O.P.
- (1621–1622) : Francisco de Santjust y de Castro, O.S.B.
- (1622–1627) : Pedro Magarola Fontanet
- (1627–1629) : Francisco López de Mendoza
- (1630–1634) : Gregorio Parcero de Castro, O.S.B.
- (1636–1637) : Gaspar Prieto Orduña, O. de M.
- (1638–1643) : François Perez Roy

(1643–1668) : Sede Vacante

(1643) : Joseph du Vivier de Saint-Martin (Vicar-General, not Bishop)

- Vincent de Margarit, O.P. (1668–1672)
  - (1673–1675) : Jean-Louis de Bruelh (Bishop-elect)
  - (1675–1680) : Jean-Baptiste d`Étampes de Valençay
- (1682–1695) : Louis Habert de Montmort
- (1695–1721) : Jean Hervé Basan de Flamenville

(1721) : Antoine Boivin de Vaurouy

- (1721–1726) :Sede Vacante
- (1726–1743) : Jean Mathias Barthélemy de Gramont de Lanta
- (1743–1783) : Charles-François-Alexandre de Cardevac D'Havrincourt
- (1783–1788) : Jean Gabriel D’Agay
- (1788–1790) : Antoine-Félix de Leyris D'Esponchez (1801)

Constitutional Church (schismatic)

- (1791–1793) : Gabriel Deville (Constitutional Bishop of Pyrénées Orientales)
- (1798–1801) : Dominique-Paul Villa (Constitutional Bishop)

=== Since 1801 ===
- (1822–1853) : Jean-François de Saunhac-Belcastel
- (1853–1864) : Philippe-Olympe Gerbet
- (1864–1876) : Etienne-Emile Ramadié
- (1876–1877) : Joseph-Frédéric Saivet
- (1877–1885) : Jean-Auguste-Emile Caraguel
- (1886–1899) : Noël-Mathieu-Victor-Marie Gaussail
- (1899–1932) : Jules-Louis-Marie de Carsalade du Pont
- (1933–1959) : Henri-Marius Bernard
- (1960–1971) : Joël-André-Jean-Marie Bellec
- (1972–1981) : Henry-Camille-Gustave-Marie L'Heureux
- (1982–1996) : Jean Chabbert, O.F.M.
- (1996–2002) : André Louis Fort
- (2004–2014) : André Marceau
- (2014–2022) : Norbert Turini
- (2023–pres.) : Thierry Scherrer

== See also ==
- Catholic Church in France
- List of Catholic dioceses in France

== Bibliography ==
=== Reference works ===
- Gams, Pius Bonifatius (1873). Series episcoporum Ecclesiae catholicae: quotquot innotuerunt a beato Petro apostolo. Ratisbon: Typis et Sumptibus Georgii Josephi Manz. pp. 599–601. (Use with caution; obsolete)
- Eubel, Conradus, ed. (1913). Hierarchia catholica, Tomus 1 (in Latin) (second ed.). Münster: Libreria Regensbergiana. pp. 238–239.
- Eubel, Conradus, ed. (1914). Hierarchia catholica, Tomus 2 (in Latin) (second ed.). Münster: Libreria Regensbergiana. p. 150.
- Eubel, Conradus; Gulik, Guilelmus, eds. (1923). Hierarchia catholica, Tomus 3 (in Latin) (second ed.). Münster: Libreria Regensbergiana. p. 192.
- Gauchat, Patritius (Patrice) (1935). Hierarchia catholica IV (1592-1667) (in Latin). Münster: Libraria Regensbergiana. pp. 181–182.
- Ritzler, Remigius; Sefrin, Pirminus (1952). Hierarchia catholica medii et recentis aevi V (1667-1730) (in Latin). Patavii: Messagero di S. Antonio. pp. 193–194.
- Ritzler, Remigius; Sefrin, Pirminus (1958). Hierarchia catholica medii et recentis aevi VI (1730-1799) (in Latin). Patavii: Messagero di S. Antonio. p. 206.
- Sainte-Marthe, Denis de; Hauréau, Barthélemy (1739). Gallia Christiana: In Provincias Ecclesiasticas Distributa, De provincia Narbonensi (in Latin). Vol. (VI). Paris: Typographia Regia. pp. 1030–79, Instrumenta, 474–497.

=== Studies ===
- Beaulieu, Ernest-Marie de, O.Min.Cap. (1903). Les Sanctuaires de la Vierge en Roussillon. Vol. 2 vols. Perpignan: impr. de C. Latrobe.
- Borrallo, Joseph (1909). Promenades archéologiques. Première promenade archéologique: Elne et sa cathédrale (in French). Perpignan: Impr. de Barrière.
- Brutails, Jean-Auguste (1886), "Étude sur l'esclavage en Roussillon du XIIe au XVIIe siècle," Nouvelle revue historique de droit français et étranger (in French). Vol. 10. Paris: L. Larose. 1886. pp. 388–427.
- Brutails, Jean-Auguste (1887). Monographie de la cathédrale et du cloître d'Elne ... (in French). Perpignan: Latrobe.
- Devic, Claude; Vaissete, J. (1876). Histoire générale de Languedoc (in French). Vol. Tome quatrième. Toulouse: Édouard Privat. pp. 339–358.
- Duchesne, Louis (1907). Fastes épiscopaux de l'ancienne Gaule: I. Provinces du Sud-Est (in French) (2nd ed.). Paris: Fontemoing. pp. 319–320.
- Hefele, Karl Joseph (1871). Histoire des conciles d'après les documents originaux: 870-1085 (in French). Vol. Tome VI (870-1085). Paris: Adrien le Clere et Cie, Libraires-Éditeurs.
- Jean, Armand (1891). Les évêques et les archevêques de France depuis 1682 jusqu'à 1801 (in French). Paris: A. Picard. pp. 273–275.
- Paul Pisani (1907). Répertoire biographique de l'épiscopat constitutionnel (1791-1802) (in French). Paris: A. Picard et fils. pp. 396–400.
- Puiggari, Pierre (1842). Cataloque biographique des évêques d'Elne: avec six portraits (in French). Perpignan: J. B. Alzine.
- Torreilles, Philippe (1896). Perpignan pendant la révolution, 1789-1800 (in French). Vol. 1–2. Perpignan: Ch. Latrobe.
- Vidal, Pierre (1887). Elne historique et archéologique (in French). Perpignan: imp. de l'Indépendant.

=== For further reading ===
- Barthélemy, Édouard de (1857). Etude sur les établissements monastiques du Roussillon: (Diocèse d'Elne-Perpignan) (in French). Paris: A. Aubry.
- Gazanyola, Jean de; Guiraud de Saint Marsal, Raymond Marc Antoine (1857). Histoire du Roussillon (in French). Perpignan: J. B. Alzine.
- Michaud, Eugène (1883). Louis XIV et Innocent XI: d'après les correspondances diplomatiques inédites du Ministère des affaires étrangères de France (in French). Vol. 4 vols. Paris: G. Charpentier.
- Tolra de Bordas, Joseph (1884). L'Ordre de Saint-François d'Assise en Roussillon, fragments et récits sur l'histoire ecclésiastique du diocèse d'Elne (in French). Paris: V. Palmé.
