= André Marceau =

French Catholic prelate (born 1946)

The Most Reverend André Marceau
- Bishop of Nice
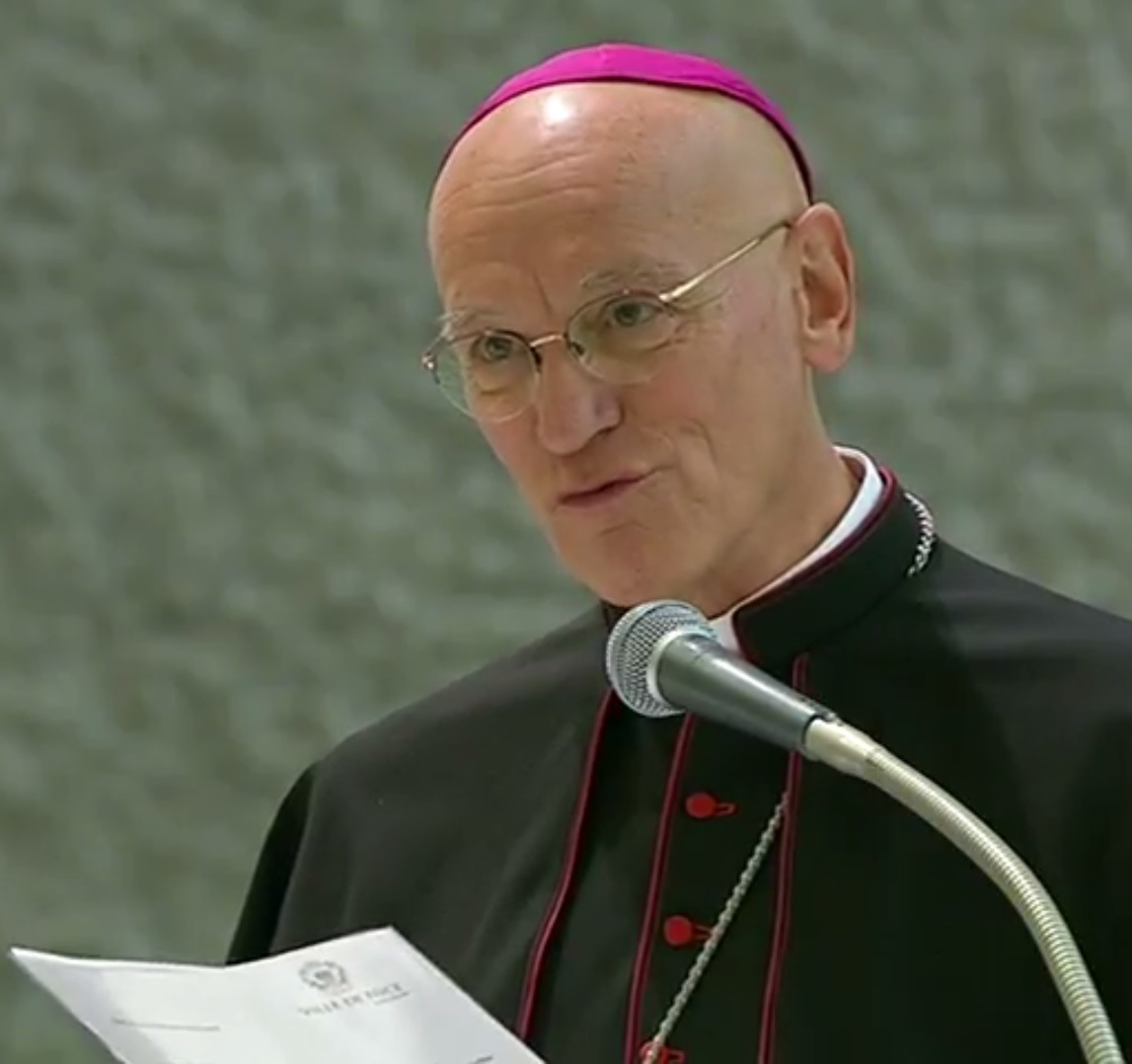
- Marceau at a papal audience in mid-2016.
- Church: Roman Catholic Church
- Diocese: Nice
- See: Nice
- Appointed: 6 March 2014
- Installed: 11 May 2014
- Predecessor: Louis Albert Joseph Roger Sankalé
- Previous post(s): Bishop of Perpignan-Elne (2004-14)

Orders
- Ordination: 25 March 1972
- Consecration: 7 March 2004 by Jean-Pierre Ricard

Personal details
- Born: André Marceau; 6 May 1946 (age 78); Cérons, Gironde, France
- Motto: Serviteur et Témoin
- Coat of arms

André Marceau (born 6 May 1946) is a French prelate of the Catholic Church who served as the Bishop of Perpignan from 2004 to 2014 and as the Bishop of Nice from 2014 to 2022.

== Biography ==
Born 6 May 1946 in Cérons (Gironde, France), André Marceau completed his secondary school studies at the minor seminary there and entered the major seminary to begin his philosophy studies. He did his national service from 1966 to 1968 teaching history and geography at the minor seminary in Bingerville in the Ivory Coast. He then completed his studies in Bordeaux and was ordained a priest on 25 March 1972. He worked for the next eight years in the Parish of St. Vincent in Mérignac on the outskirts of Bordeaux, at the same time pursuing studies in pedagogy at the University of Bordeaux. He studied at the Catholic Institute of Paris from 1980 to 1982. For the next ten years he was responsible for the diocesan catechumenate, while also heading priestly formation for the last four of those years.

He became an episcopal vicar of the Archdiocese of Bordeaux in 1992, first responsible for the Gironde-Sud sector until 1996 and then for the other sectors until 2002.

He was appointed Bishop of Perpignan-Elne (Pyrénées-Orientales) on 13 January 2004 by Pope John Paul II. On 7 March 2004 he received his episcopal consecration from Cardinal Jean-Pierre Ricard in the Saint-Jean-Baptiste Cathedral of Perpignan.

Within the Bishops' Conference of France he has been a member of the Council for Interreligious Relations and New Religious Movements.

On 6 March 2014, he was appointed bishop of Nice. and he was installed there on 11 May.

Pope Francis accepted his resignation on 9 March 2022.

== See also ==
- Catholic Church in France
