= Jean-Pierre Ricard =

French prelate of the Catholic Church (born 1944)

His Eminence Jean-Pierre Ricard
- Cardinal, Archbishop emeritus of Bordeaux
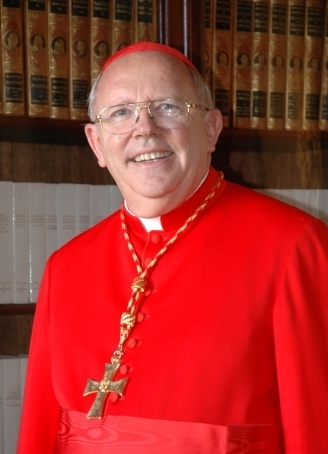
- Church: Catholic
- Archdiocese: Bordeaux
- Installed: 21 December 2001
- Term ended: 1 October 2019
- Predecessor: Pierre Étienne Louis Eyt
- Successor: Jean-Paul James
- Other post: Cardinal-Priest of Sant’Agostino (2006‍–‍)
- Previous posts: Auxiliary Bishop of Grenoble (1993‍–‍1996); Titular Bishop of Pulcheriopolis (1993‍–‍1996); Coadjutor Bishop of Montpellier (1996); Bishop of Montpellier (1996‍–‍2001); Member, Council for the Economy (2014‍–‍2020)

Orders
- Ordination: 5 October 1968 by Georges Jacquot
- Consecration: 6 June 1993 by Robert-Joseph Coffy
- Created cardinal: 24 March 2006 by Pope Benedict XVI
- Rank: Cardinal-Priest

Personal details
- Born: 26 September 1944 (age 81) Marseille, France
- Motto: Propter Evangelium (Latin for 'For the Sake of the Gospel')
- Coat of arms

Styles of Jean-Pierre Ricard
- Reference style: His Eminence
- Spoken style: Your Eminence
- Informal style: Cardinal

Jean-Pierre Ricard (born 26 September 1944) is a French prelate of the Catholic Church who was Archbishop of Bordeaux from 2001 to 2019. He has been a cardinal since 2006. He was previously Bishop of Montpellier for five years and before that an auxiliary bishop in Grenoble. From 2001 to 2007 he was president of the French Episcopal Conference.

In November 2022, Ricard admitted he sexually abused a 14-year-old girl in the 1980s when he was a parish priest. Both French prosecutors and the Holy See launched investigations, though criminal proceedings were dropped in February 2023 because the statute of limitations had expired. Church authorities then imposed restrictions on Ricard's exercise of his ministry for five years.

== Education ==
Born in Marseille on 26 September 1944 to Georges and Jeanine Ricard, Jean-Pierre Ricard attended the Lycée de Saint-Charles and the Lycée Périer where he earned his Baccalauréat and then at Lycée Thiers (hypokhâgne). He studied philosophy at the Major Seminary of Marseille from 1962 to 1964. He spent one year performing National Service to promote development in Bamako, Mali. He also studied at the Carmes Seminary in Paris, and the Institut Catholique de Paris, earning a degree in theology and preparing for a doctorate.

== Priest ==
He was ordained a priest on 5 October 1968 in Marseille and did pastoral work in the Archdiocese of Marseille from 1968 to 1993. He was assistant pastor of the parish of Sainte-Émilie de Vialoar from 1970 to 1978 with responsibility for religious teaching, the formation of priests and laymen. He headed the Mistral Center of Religious Culture from 1975 to 1981 and was diocesan delegate for seminarians from 1975 to 1985. While pastor of the parish of Sainte-Marguerite from 1981 to 1988, he served as associate delegate for ecumenism and episcopal vicar for the zone of south Marseille from 1984 to 1988. He was regional theologian for pastoral affairs (1986–1993) and general secretary of the Diocesan Synod of Marseille (1988–1991), and vicar general from 1988 to 1993 to Cardinal Robert Coffy, Archbishop of Marseille.

== Bishop ==
Ricard was named titular bishop of Pulcheriopoli and appointed auxiliary bishop of Grenoble on 17 April 1993. He received his episcopal consecration on 6 June 1993 at the cathedral of Sainte-Marie-Majeure, Marseille, from Cardinal Coffy. On 4 July 1996 he was appointed Coadjutor Bishop of Montpellier and became bishop there upon the death of his predecessor on 6 September.

He became vice-president of the Bishops' Conference of France on 9 November 1999 and participated in the Tenth Ordinary Synod of Bishops, held in Vatican City, 30 September–27 October 2001. He was elected to a three-year term as president of the Conference on 6 November 2001 and re-elected to another term in 2004.

Pope John Paul II named him Archbishop of Bordeaux on 21 December 2001. On 6 September 2002, John Paul named him a member of the Congregation for the Doctrine of the Faith, and Pope Benedict renewed that appointment on 6 May 2006. He attended the 11th General Ordinary Assembly of the Synod of Bishops, Vatican City, 2–23 October 2005.

He gave a series of interviews that appeared as a book, Les Sept Défis pour l'Eglise (The Seven Challenges for the Church) in 2003.

== Cardinal ==
He was made Cardinal-Priest of Sant'Agostino in the consistory of 24 March 2006 by Pope Benedict XVI. He was appointed to the Pontifical Commission Ecclesia Dei, the commission responsible for relations with the Society of Saint Pius X on 8 April 2006. On 17 January 2009, Pope Benedict XVI appointed him a member of the Pontifical Council for Culture.

In 2006, as president of the French Bishops Conference, Ricard objected to the recent authorization of the use of human embryos for scientific research in France and elsewhere in Europe. He called it a grave ethical transgression. In 2009 Ricard told the newspaper La Croix that the Pope Benedict wanted to reconcile all Catholics by allowing a wider use of the Traditional Latin Mass, which does not undermine the achievements of Vatican Council II.

On 21 January 2010 he was appointed a member of the Pontifical Council for Promoting Christian Unity, and on 6 July 2010 of the Congregation for Divine Worship and the Discipline of the Sacraments, and on 12 June 2012 of the Congregation for Catholic Education, and confirmed in the Education post by Pope Francis on 30 November 2013.

He was one of the cardinal electors who participated in the 2013 papal conclave that elected Pope Francis.

On 8 March 2014, he was named by Pope Francis to serve as a member of the newly established Council for Economic Affairs, intended to oversee the work of the new Secretariat for the Economy, the financial regulatory agency for the departments of the Roman Curia. (Note: Ricard had been appointed in 2011 by Pope Benedict to an earlier Council of Cardinals established to review Vatican finances and organization.)

He closed the Archdiocese's Saint Joseph seminary in May 2019 because enrollment failed to meet the minimum number of seminarians required. He said its seminarians can continue their studies and spiritual formation in Toulouse or Rome and that the closure was part of a national assessment of the country's many small seminaries.

On 11 July 2019, Bordeaux Mayor Nicolas Florian awarded Ricard the city's medal. On that occasion, Ricard praised the city for fostering collaboration between civic authorities and the leaders of its religious communities. He said he anticipated retiring as Archbishop of Bordeaux in a few weeks and returning to his native region. He announced on 4 August that he had already submitted his letter of resignation to Pope Francis, (Note: A diocesan bishop is required to submit his resignation upon turning 75, but it takes effect at the pope's discretion. Pope Francis waited eighteen months to accept the resignation that Georges Pontier, Archbishop of Marseille, submitted at 75. On the other hand, in the case of Thierry Jordan, Archbishop of Reims, his acceptance came a few weeks before Jordan's 75th birthday.) who accepted it on 1 October without naming his successor.

On 10 February 2022, Ricard was named papal delegate for the Foyers de charité, an organization subject to oversight by the Dicastery for the Laity, Family and Life following disclosures in 2020 of sexual abuse committed by one of its founders.

== Admission of sexual abuse ==
Prompted by the February 2022 announcement that Ricard had been charged with supervising a religious organization where sexual abuses had occurred, a 50-year-old woman contacted the president of the Conference of men and women religious of France, Véronique Margron, and reported that Ricard, a close friend of her family at the time, had subjected her to sexual abuse in the 1980s when he was working as a priest in Marseilles. This anonymous woman's parents, motivated by the same report of Richard's appointment as apostolic delegate in February, wrote a letter about Ricard's behavior to the bishop of Nice. (Note: André Marceau became bishop of Nice in 2014. Pope Francis accepted his resignation on 9 March and announced the appointment of Jean-Philippe Nault to succeed him. Nault was installed in Nice on 8 May.)

Ricard resigned as apostolic delegate for the Foyers de charité in March, just a month after accepting the assignment, citing health problems and was succeeded by Michel Dubost, bishop emeritus of Évry, on 11 March.

When the bishop of Nice eventually learned how young Ricard's victim had been, he forwarded her parents' letter to civil authorities in October. By November, authorities in Marseilles had opened a preliminary investigation of aggravated sexual assault.

On 7 November 2022, Éric de Moulins-Beaufort, Archbishop of Reims and president of the French Bishops Conference, released a statement in which Ricard admitted abusing a 14-year-old girl when he was a parish priest in the 1980s: "My behaviour has inevitably led to grave and lasting consequences for this person." He pledged to withdraw from public ministry. (Note: Ricard sent his statement to Moulins-Beaufort on 6 November so he could read it to a meeting of the French Bishops Conference.)

Following the release of Ricard's statement, Margron, a figure well known in France for her campaigning against clerical sexual abuse, told an interviewer that she had found Ricard's victim "credible and sincere" and that she had described an experience of "powerful trauma of great violence". Margron also said she feared Ricard was minimizing what he had done, that she expected the Church to take disciplinary action and that he should be denied his right as a cardinal to participate in a papal election. She said the language he used to describe his actions–"reprehensible conduct" (comportement répréhensible)–was subject to many interpretations and commented: "It means everything and nothing. One needs to specify what we are talking about!"

French authorities dropped criminal proceedings against Ricard in February 2023 because the statute of limitations had expired. Later in the spring, the Dicastery for the Doctrine of the Faith imposed restrictions on Ricard for a term of five years–which can be extended–prohibiting him from acting as a priest publicly outside his diocese of residence, currently Digne, and only privately within that diocese with the permission of the local bishop, Emmanuel Gobilliard, who has opposed granting permission. His status and privileges as a cardinal were not affected.

== See also ==
- Catholic Church in France

== Notes ==
Catholic Church titles
Preceded by Louis-Antoine-Marie Boffet	Bishop of Montpellier; 1996–2001	Succeeded by Guy Marie Alexandre Thomazeau as Archbishop of Montpellier
Preceded by Louis-Marie Billé	President of the Bishop's Conference of France; 2001–2007	Succeeded by André Vingt-Trois
Preceded by Pierre Eyt	Archbishop of Bordeaux; 2001–2019	Succeeded by Jean-Paul James
Preceded by Marcelo González Martín	Cardinal-Priest of Sant'Agostino; 2006–present	Incumbent
