= Montpellier Cathedral =

Roman Catholic church in Occitania, France

- Cathédrale Saint-Pierre de Montpellier
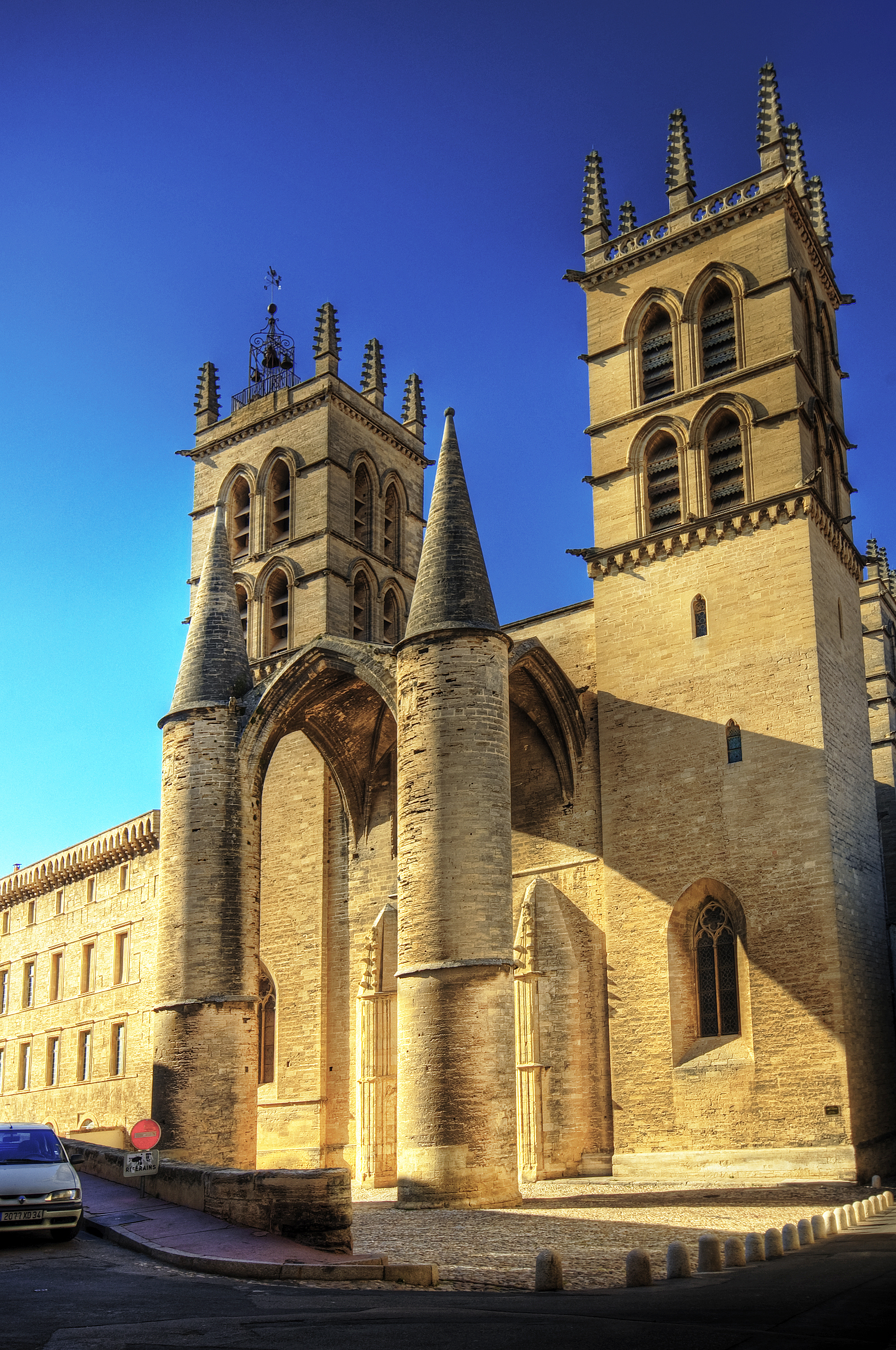
- South façade of Montpellier Cathedral in 2008
- Montpellier Cathedral
- 43°36′48″N 3°52′27″E
- Location: Montpellier, France
- Denomination: Roman Catholic
- Tradition: Roman Rite
- Website: www.cathedrale-montpellier.fr

Architecture
- Style: Gothic
- Groundbreaking: 14th century

Administration
- Archdiocese: Montpellier

Montpellier Cathedral (French: Cathédrale Saint-Pierre de Montpellier) is a Roman Catholic church dedicated to Saint Peter and located in the city of Montpellier, France. It is the seat of the Archbishops of Montpellier. The cathedral, built in the Gothic style, is a national monument.

== History ==
The cathedral was originally the church of the monastery of Saint-Benoît, which was founded in 1364. The building was elevated to the status of cathedral in 1536, when the see of Maguelone was transferred to Montpellier. After the building suffered extensive damage during the Wars of Religion between Catholics and Protestants in the 16th century, it was rebuilt in the 17th.

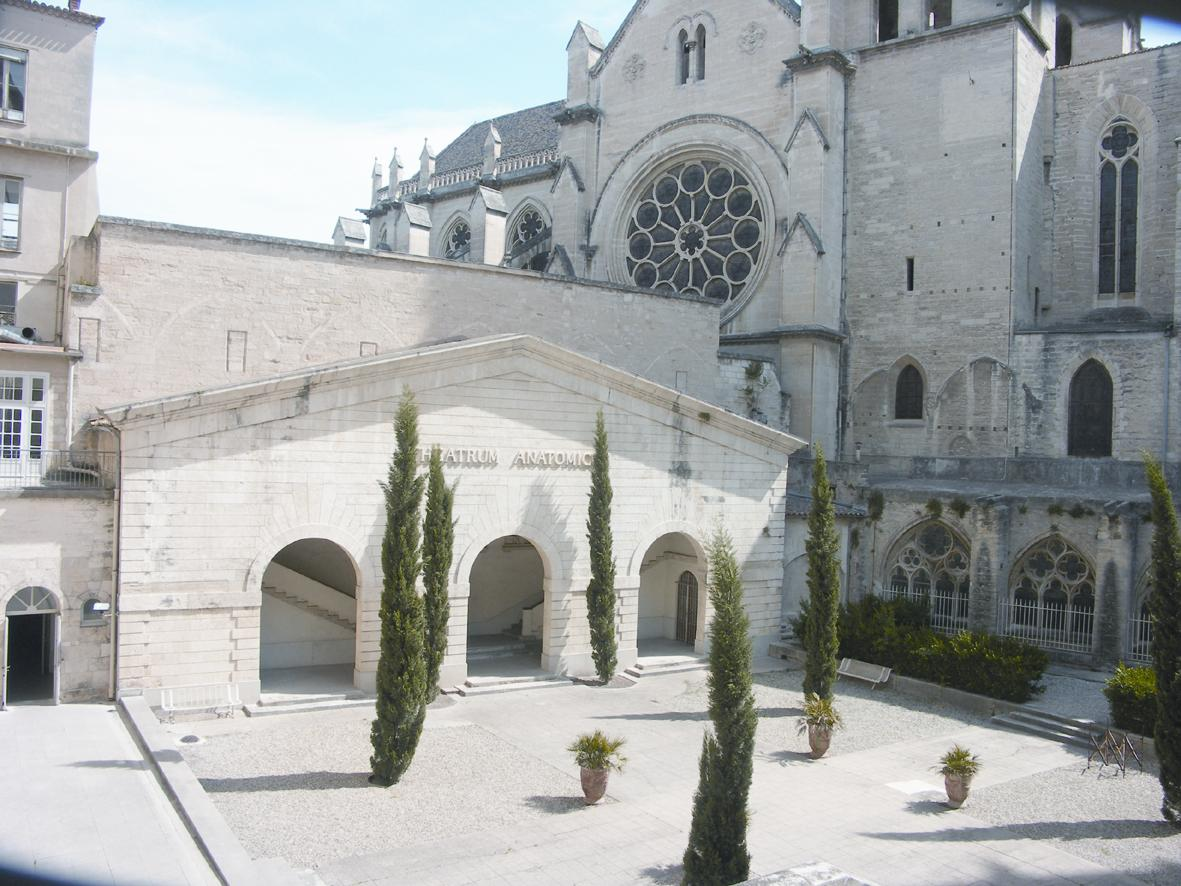
The courtyard of the School of Medicine, formerly the cloister of the monastery

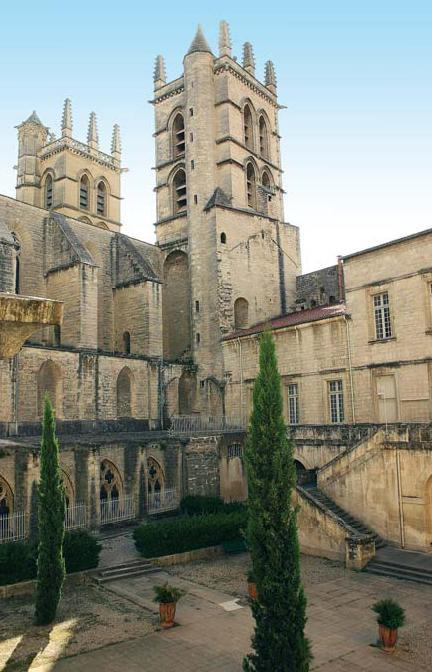
The bell tower seen from the courtyard of the School of Medicine

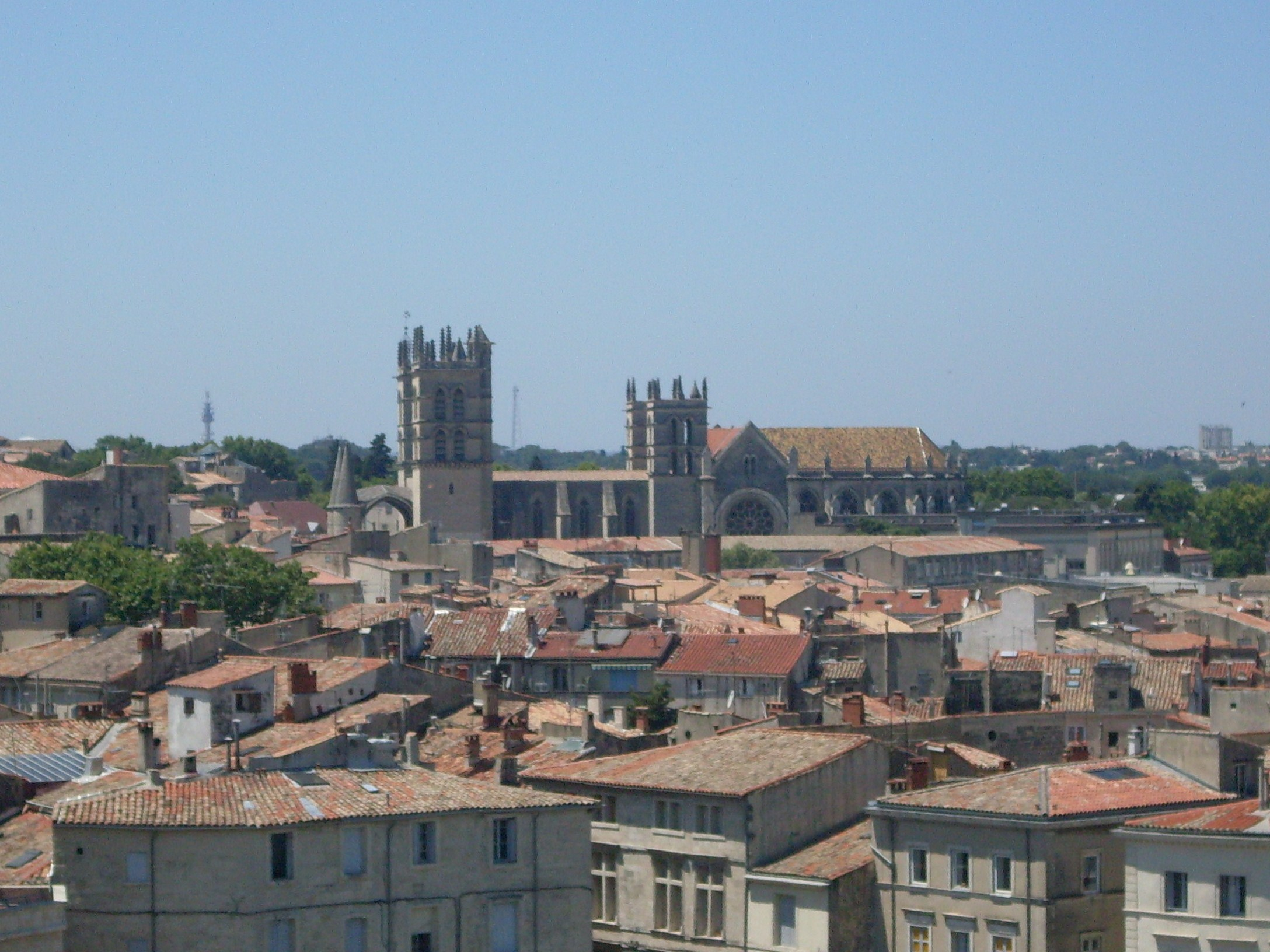
View from the Corum

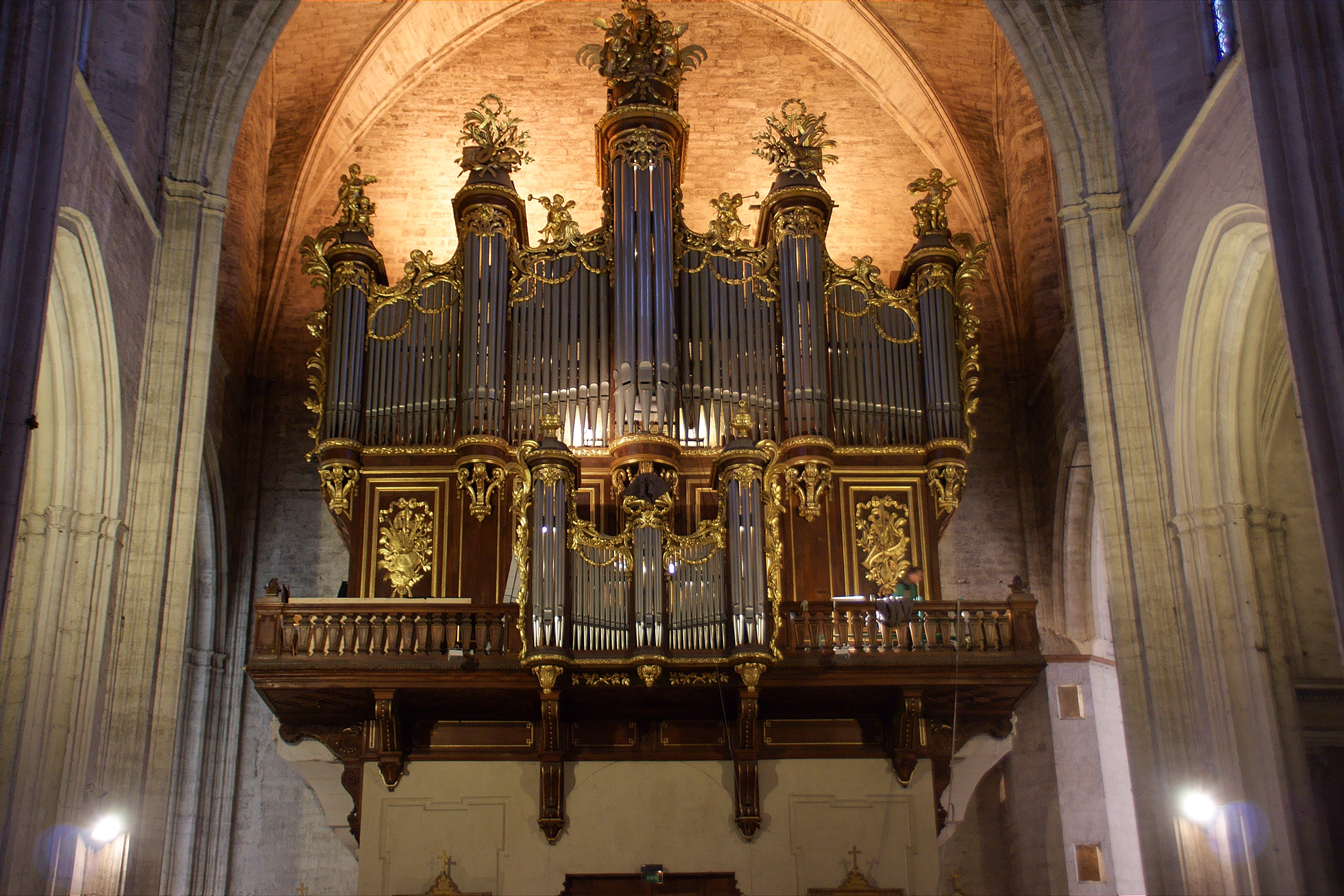
The Lépine organ restored by Kern

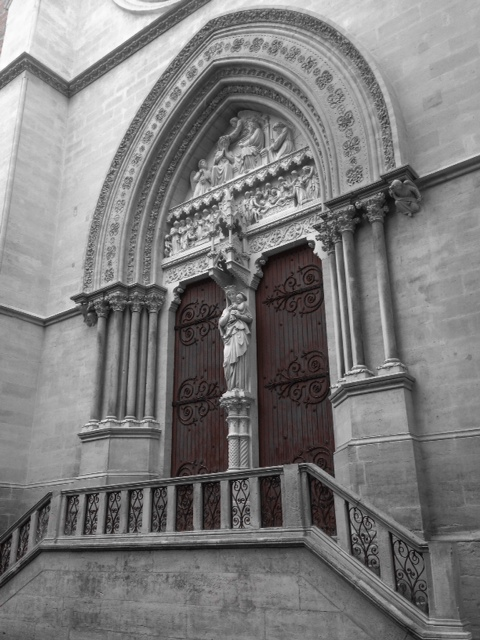
One of the east entrances
