= Archdiocese of Montpellier =

Catholic archdiocese in France

Coordinates: 43°36′49″N 3°52′31″E

Metropolitan Archdiocese of Montpellier (–Lodève–Béziers–Agde–Saint-Pons-de-Thomières) Archidioecesis Metropolitae Montis Pessulani (–Lotevensis–Biterrensis–Agathensis–Sancti Pontii Thomeriarum) Archidiocèse Metropolitain de Montpellier (–Lodève–Béziers–Agde–Saint-Pons-de-Thomières)

Catholic
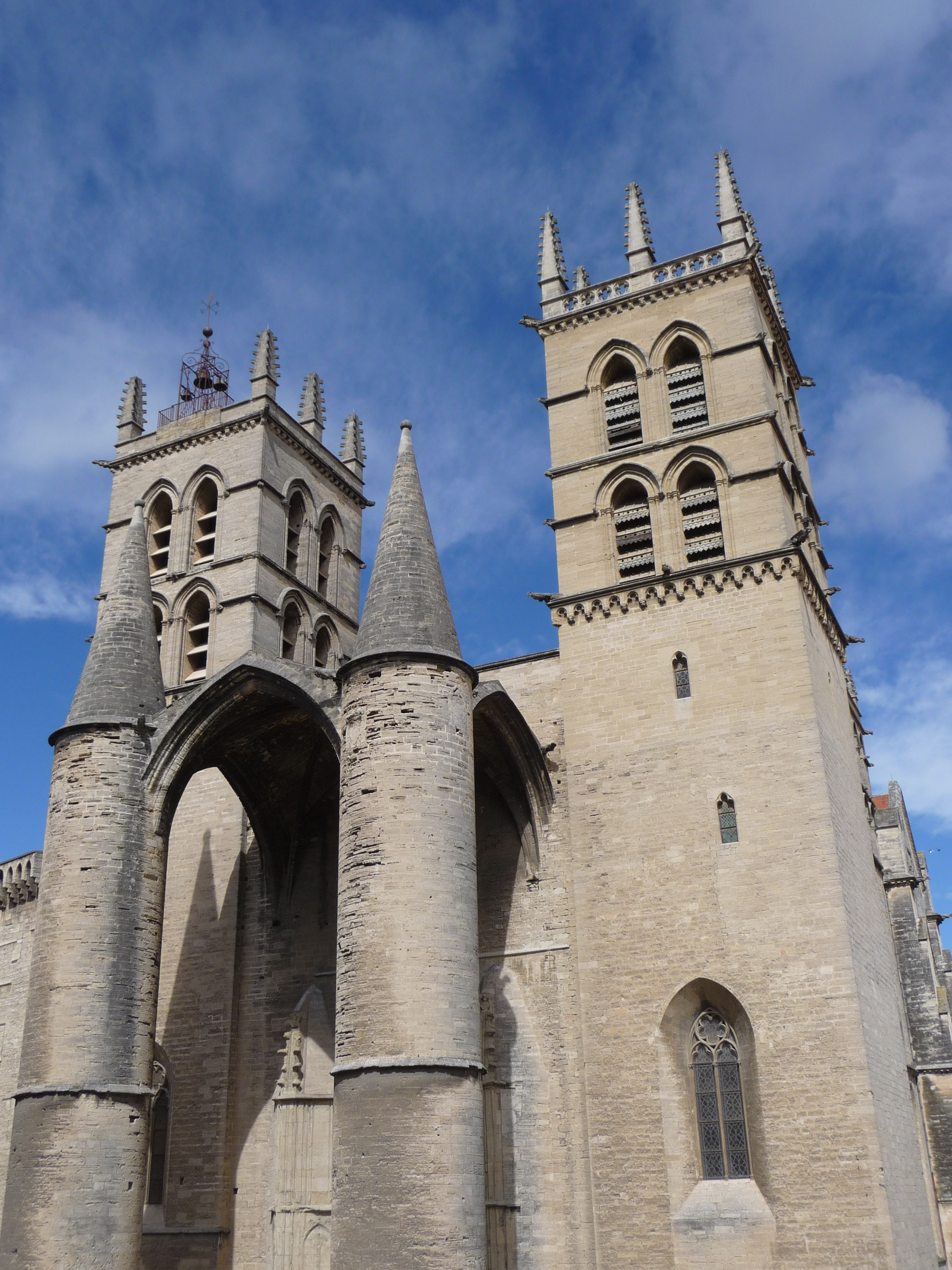
- Montpellier Cathedral

Location
- Country: France
- Ecclesiastical province: Montpellier

Statistics
- Area: 6,101 km^{2} (2,356 sq mi)
- Population: Total; Catholics: (as of 2021); 1,176,000; 844,300 (71.8%)
- Parishes: 62

Information
- Denomination: Catholic
- Sui iuris church: Latin Church
- Rite: Roman Rite
- Established: 3rd Century (Diocese of Magalonensis); Name Changed: 27 March 1536; Elevated: 8 December 2002
- Cathedral: Cathedral Basilica of St. Peter in Montpellier
- Patron saint: Saint Peter; Saint Paul
- Secular priests: 148 (Diocesan); 102 (Religious Orders); 35 Permanent Deacons

Current leadership
- Pope: Leo XIV
- Archbishop: Norbert Turini
- Metropolitan Archbishop: Norbert Turini
- Suffragans: Diocese of Carcassonne and Narbonne; Diocese of Mende; Diocese of Nîmes; Diocese of Perpignan–Elne
- Bishops emeritus: Guy Marie Alexandre Thomazeau; Pierre-Marie Carré

Map

Website
- Website of the Archdiocese

Montpellier and its Suffragans

The Metropolitan Archdiocese of Montpellier (–Lodève–Béziers–Agde–Saint-Pons-de-Thomières) (Latin: Archidioecesis Metropolitae Montis Pessulani (–Lotevensis–Biterrensis–Agathensis–Sancti Pontii Thomeriarum); French: Archidiocèse Metropolitain de Montpellier (–Lodève–Béziers–Agde–Saint-Pons-de-Thomières)) is a Latin archdiocese of the Catholic Church in south-western France. The current metropolitan archbishop is Pierre-Marie Carré; the immediate past Archbishop Emeritus is Guy Marie Alexandre Thomazeau. On September 16, 2002, as part of the reshuffling of the map of the French ecclesiastical provinces, the diocese of Montpellier (Lodève, Béziers, Agde, and Saint-Pons-de-Thomières) ceased to be a suffragan of Avignon and was elevated to archdiocese and metropolitan of a new ecclesiastical province, with the dioceses of Carcassonne, Mende, Nimes (Uzès and Alès) and Perpignan–Elne as suffragans.

== History ==
The diocese's original date of establishment is uncertain. The earliest evidence of Christian presence in the area is a tombstone, which Edmond-Frédéric Le Blant dated to the fourth century. The earliest known bishop dates to the sixth century.

When the Concordat of 1802 reestablished this diocese, it accorded to it also the département of Tarn, which was detached from it in 1822 by the creation of the Archdiocese of Albi; and from 1802 to 1822, Montpellier was a suffragan of Toulouse. A Papal Brief of 16 June 1877, authorized the bishops of Montpellier to style themselves bishops of Montpellier, Béziers, Agde, Lodève and Saint-Pons, in memory of the different dioceses united in the present diocese of Montpellier.

Maguelone was the original diocese. Local traditions, recorded in 1583 by Abbé Gariel in his Histoire des évêques de Maguelonne, affirm that St. Simon the Leper, having landed at the mouth of the Rhône with St. Lazarus and his sisters, was the earliest apostle of Maguelone. Gariel invokes in favour of this tradition a certain manuscript brought from Byzantium. But the chronicler, Bishop Arnaud de Verdale (1339–1352) was ignorant of this alleged Apostolic origin of Maguelone. It is certain that the tombstone of a Christian woman named Vera was found at Maguelone; Le Blant assigns it to the 4th century.

The first historically known Bishop of Maguelone, Boetius, assisted at the Council of Narbonne in 589. Maguelone was completely destroyed in the course of the wars between Charles Martel and the Saracens. The diocese was then transferred to Substantion, but Bishop Arnaud (1030–1060) brought it back to Maguelone which he rebuilt.

Near Maguelone had grown up by degrees the two villages of Montpellier and Montpellieret. According to legend, they were in the tenth century the property of the two sisters of St. Fulcran, Bishop of Lodève. About 975 they gave them to Ricuin, Bishop of Maguelone. It is certain that about 990 Ricuin possessed these two villages; he kept Montpellieret and gave Montpellier in fief to the family of the Guillems. In 1085 Pierre, Count of Substantion and Melgueil, became a vassal of the Holy See for this countship, and relinquished the right of nomination to the diocese of Maguelone. Urban II charged the Bishop of Maguelone to exercise the papal suzerainty, and he spent five days in this town when he came to France to preach the First Crusade. In 1215 Pope Innocent III gave the countship of Melgueil in fief to the Bishop of Maguelone, who thus became a Prince-bishop.

From that time the Bishop of Maguelone had the right of coinage. Pope Clement IV reproached (1266) Bishop Bérenger Frédol with causing to be struck in his diocese a coin called "Miliarensis", on which was rend the name of Mahomet; in fact at that date the bishop, as well as the King of Aragon and the Count of Toulouse, authorized the coinage of Arabic money, not intended for circulation in Maguelone, but to be sold for exportation to the merchants of the Mediterranean.

In July, 1204, Montpellier passed into the hands of Peter II of Aragon, son-in-law of the last of the Guillems; James I of Aragon, son of Peter II, united the city to the Kingdom of Majorca. In 1282 the King of Majorca paid homage to the King of France for Maguelone. Bérenger Frédol, Bishop of Maguelone, ceded Montpellier to Philip IV of France (1292). James III of Majorca sold Montpellier to Philip VI (1349); and the city, save for the period from 1365 to 1382, was henceforth French.

Urban V had studied theology and canon law at Montpellier and was crowned pope by Cardinal Ardouin Aubert, nephew of Innocent VI, and Bishop of Maguelone from 1352 to 1354; hence the attachment of Pope Urban for this diocese which he favoured greatly. In 1364 he founded at Montpellier of a Benedictine monastery under the patronage of St. Germain, and came himself to Montpellier to see the new church (9 January - 8 March 1367). He caused the city to be surrounded by ramparts, in order that the scholars might work there in safety; and finally he caused a large canal to be begun by which Montpellier might communicate with the sea.

At the request of King Francis I, who pleaded the epidemics and the ravages of the pirates which constantly threatened Maguelone, Pope Paul III transferred the see to Montpellier (27 March 1536). Montpellier, into which Calvinism was introduced in February, 1560, by the pastor, Guillaume Mauget, was much troubled by the wars of religion. Under Henry III of France a sort of Calvinistic republic was installed there. The city was reconquered by Louis XIII (October, 1622).

Among the 54 bishops of Maguelone, and the 18 bishops of Montpellier, may be mentioned: Blessed Louis Aleman (1418–1423), later Bishop of Arles; Guillaume Pellicier (1527–68), whom king Francis I of France sent as an ambassador to Venice, and whose leaning as a humanist and naturalist made him after Scévole de Sainte-Marthe "the most learned man of his century"; the preacher Pierre Fenouillet (1608–52); François de Bosquet (1657–76), whose historical labours were very useful to the celebrated Baluze; the bibliophile Colbert de Croissy (1696–1738), who induced the Oratorian Pouget to compose in 1702 the famous "Catechism of Montpellier", condemned by the Holy See in 1712 and 1721 for Jansenistic tendencies; Fournier (1806–34), who in 1801 was confined for a time in the madhouse at Bicêtre at the command of Napoleon I Bonaparte, for a sermon against the Revolution.

Among the numerous councils and synods held at Montpellier, the following merit mention: the council of 1162 in which Pope Alexander III excommunicated the antipope, Victor; the provincial synod of 1195, which was occupied with the Saracens of Spain and the Albigenses; the council of 1215, which was presided over by Peter of Benevento, legate of the Holy See and passed important canons concerning discipline, and declared also that subject to the approval of the pope, Toulouse and all the other towns taken from the Albigenses should be given to Simon de Montfort; the council of 1224, which rejected the request of Raymond, Count of Toulouse. who promised to protect the Catholic Faith and demanded that Amaury de Montfort withdraw his claims to the countship of Toulouse; the council of 1258, which by permitting the seneschal of Beaucaire to arrest ecclesiastics taken in the act of crime, in order to hand them over to the bishop, made way for royal magistrates to exercise a certain power within the limits of ecclesiastical jurisdiction and thus inaugurated the movement as a result of which, under the name of "privileged cases", a certain number of offences committed by ecclesiastics became amenable to lay justice.

== Saints ==
Special honour is paid in the present diocese of Montpellier to Saint Pontius of Cimiez (Pons de Cimiez), martyr under Emperor Valerian, patron of Saint-Pons-de-Thomières; Sts. Tiberius and Modestus and St. Florence, martyrs at Agde under Diocletian; St. Severus, Abbot of St. André, at Agde (d. about 500); Saint Maxentius, a native of Agde and founder of the Abbey of St-Maixent, in Poitou (447–515); St. Benedict of Aniane, and his disciple and first historian, Saint Ardo Smaragdus (d. in 843); St. Guillem, Duke of Aquitaine, who in 804, founded near Lodève, on the advice of St. Benedict of Aniane, the monastery of Gellone (later St-Guillem du Désert), died there in 812, and under the name of "Guillaume au Court Nez" became the hero of a celebrated epic chanson; St. Etienne, Bishop of Apt (975–1046), born at Agde; Blessed Guillaume VI, Lord of Montpellier from 1121 to 1149 and who died a Cistercian at Grandselve Abbey; Peter of Castelnau, Archdeacon of Maguelone, inquisitor (d. in 1208); Gérard de Lunel (St. Gerard), Lord of Lunel (end of thirteenth century); the celebrated pilgrim, St. Roch, who was born at Montpellier about the end of the thirteenth century, saved several cities of Italy from the pest, and returned to Montpellier to live as a hermit, where he died in 1325.

== Bishops of Maguelone ==
- Boèce (Boecio/Boetius) 589
- Geniès (Genesio/Genesius, Ginesius) 597–633?
- Gumild 672 oder 673
- Vincent 683
- Johann I. 791
- Ricuin I. 812–817
- Argemire 818 or 819
- Stabellus 821–823
- Maldomer 867
- Abbo 875–897
- Gontier 906–909
- Pons 937–947
- Ricuin II. 975
- Peter I. de Melgueil 988–1030 or 1004–1019
- Arnaud I. 1030–1060
- Bertrand I. 1060 or 1061–1079 or 1080
- Godefroi (Geoffroi) 1080–1104
- Walter von Lille 1104–1129
- Raimond I. 1129–1158
- Jean de Montlaur 1158–1190
- Guillaume de Raimond 1190–1195
- Guillaume de Fleix 1195–1202
- Guillaume D'Autignac (Antignac) 1203 or 1204–1216
- Bernard de Mèze 1216–1230 or 1232
- Jean de Montlaur II 1232–1247
- Reinier Saccoin 1247–1249
- Pierre de Conques 1248–1256
- Guillaume Christophe 1256–1263
- Bérenger Frédol 1263–1296
- Gaucelin de La Garde 1296–1304 or 1305
- Pierre de Lévis de Mirepoix 1305 or 1306–1309
- Jean Raimond de Comminges 1309–1317
- Gaillard Saumate 1317–1318
- André de Frédol 1318–1328
- Jean de Vissec 1328–1334
- Pictavin de Montesquiou 1334–1339
- Arnaud de Verdale 1339–1352
- Aldouin Alberti 1352–1353
- Durand de Chapelles 1353–1361
- Pierre de Canillac 1361
- Dieudonné de Canillac 1361–1367
- Gaucelin de Déaux (Dreux) 1367–1373
- Pierre de Vernols 1373–1389
- Antoine de Lovier 1389–1405
- Pierre Adhémar 1405 or 1408–1415
- Louis Allemand 1418–1423
- Guillaume Forestier 1423–1429
- Léger Saporis D'Eyragues 1429–1430
- Bertrand Robert 1431–1433
- Robert de Rouvres 1433–1453
- Maur de Valleville 1453–1471
- Jean Bonald 1471 oder 1472–1487
- Guillaume Le Roy de Chavigny 1487–1488
- Izarn Barrière 1487 or 1488–1498
- Guillaume Pellicier 1498–1527 or 1529

== Bishops of Montpellier ==
- Guillaume Pellicier II 1527 or 1529–1568 (of Montpellier from 1535)
- Antoine de Subjet de Cardot 1573–1596
- Guitard de Ratte 1596–1602
- Jean Garnier 1603–1607
- Pierre Fenolliet (Fenouillet) 1607–1652
- Rinaldo d'Este 1653–1655 (Cardinal)
- François Bosquet 1655–1676
- Charles de Pradel 1676–1696
- Charles-Joachim Colbert de Croissy 1696–1738
- Georges-Lazare Berger de Charency 1738–1748
- François Renaud de Villeneuve 1748–1766
- Raymond de Durfort Léobard 1766–1774
- Joseph-François de Malide 1774–1790
  - Dominique Pouderous 1791–?
  - Alexandre Victor Rouanet
- Jean-Louis-Simon Rollet 1802–1806
- Nicolas Marie Fournier de La Contamine 1806–1834
- Charles-Thomas Thibault 1835–1861
- François-Marie-Joseph Lecourtier 1861–1873
- François de Rovérié de Cabrières 1873–1921 (Cardinal from 1911)
- René-Pierre Mignen 1922–1931 (also Archbishop of Rennes)
- Gabriel Brunhes 1932–1949
- Jean Duperray 1949–1957
- Cyprien-Louis-Pierre-Clément Tourel 1958–1976
- Louis-Antoine-Marie Boffet 1976–1996
- Jean-Pierre Ricard 1996–2001, appointed Archbishop of Bordeaux)

== Archbishops ==
- Guy Marie Alexandre Thomazeau (2002–2011)
- Pierre-Marie Carré (2011–2022)
- Norbert Turini (2022–present)

== See also ==
- Catholic Church in France
- List of Catholic dioceses in France
- Maguelone Cathedral

== Bibliography ==
- Fisquet, Honoré (1864). La France pontificale (Gallia Christiana): Maguelone, Montpellier, Agde (in French). Paris: Etienne Repos.
- Société bibliographique (France) (1907). L'épiscopat français depuis le Concordat jusqu'à la Séparation (1802-1905). Paris: Librairie des Saints-Pères.

== Sources ==
- (in French) Centre national des Archives de l'Église de France, L’Épiscopat francais depuis 1919, retrieved: 2016-12-24.
