= Guy Marie Alexandre Thomazeau =

French bishop

His Excellency Guy Marie Alexandre Thomazeau
- Archbishop Emeritus of Montpellier; Apostolic Administrator of Nice
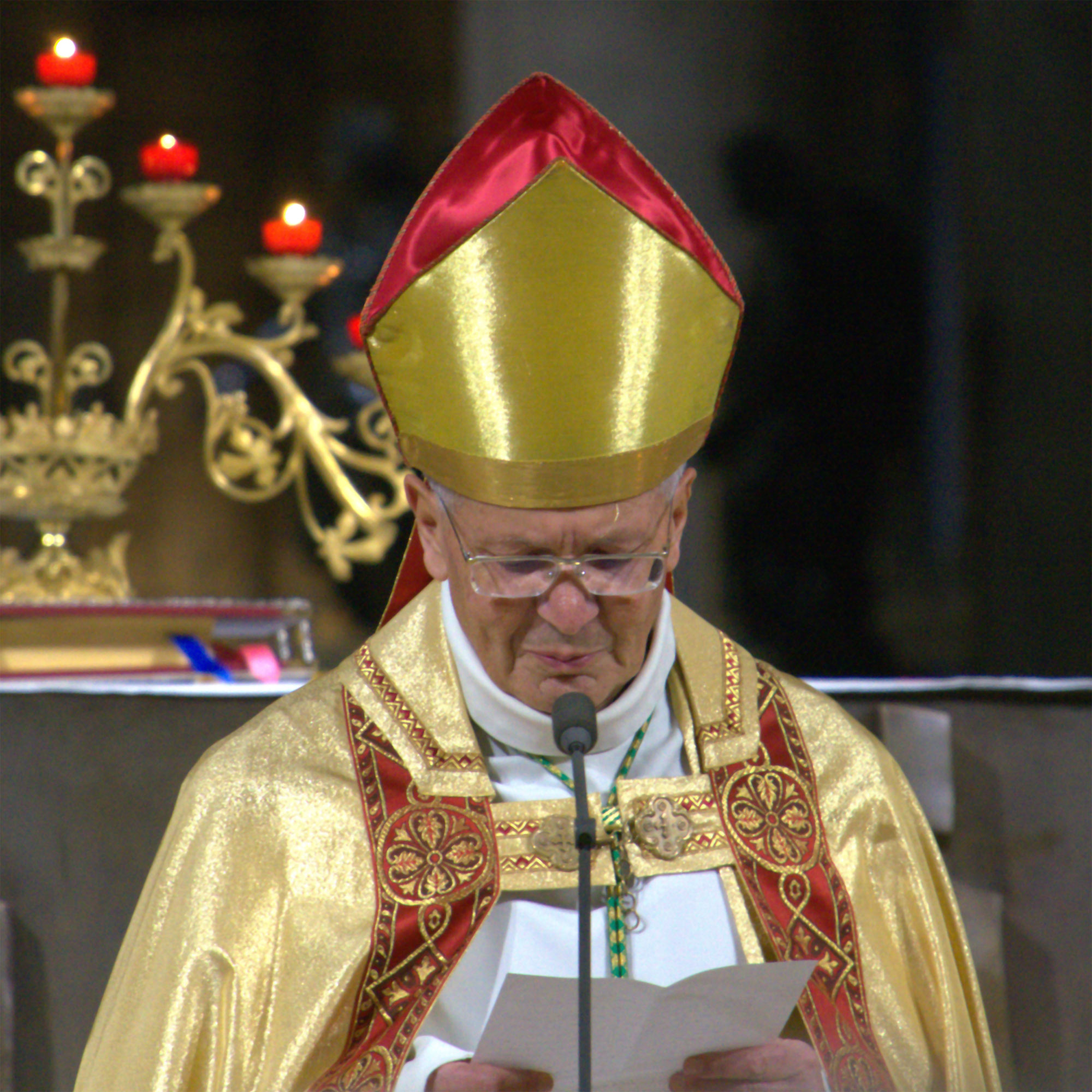
- Guy Thomazeau in 2014
- Installed: 16 December 2002
- Term ended: 3 June 2011
- Predecessor: Jean-Pierre Ricard as Bishop of Montpellier
- Successor: Pierre-Marie Joseph Carré
- Other post: Apostolic Administrator of Nice

Orders
- Ordination: 18 December 1965
- Consecration: 8 January 1989

Personal details
- Born: 5 December 1937 (age 88) Neuilly-sur-Seine, France
- Denomination: Roman Catholic

Guy Marie Alexandre Thomazeau (born 5 December 1937) was the Archbishop of Montpellier from 2002 to 2011. He was earlier Bishop of Beauvais, Bishop of Noyon, Bishop of Senlis, and auxiliary bishop of Meaux. Coming from a prominent business family, he served as 'vicaire' at Notre-Dame de Passy and subsequently as 'curé' of St. Pierre de Chaillot in the 16th arrondissement of Paris. He resigned his post of archbishop on 3 June 2011.
