= Pierre-Marie Carré =

French prelate

His Excellency Pierre-Marie Carré
- Archbishop emeritus of Montpellier
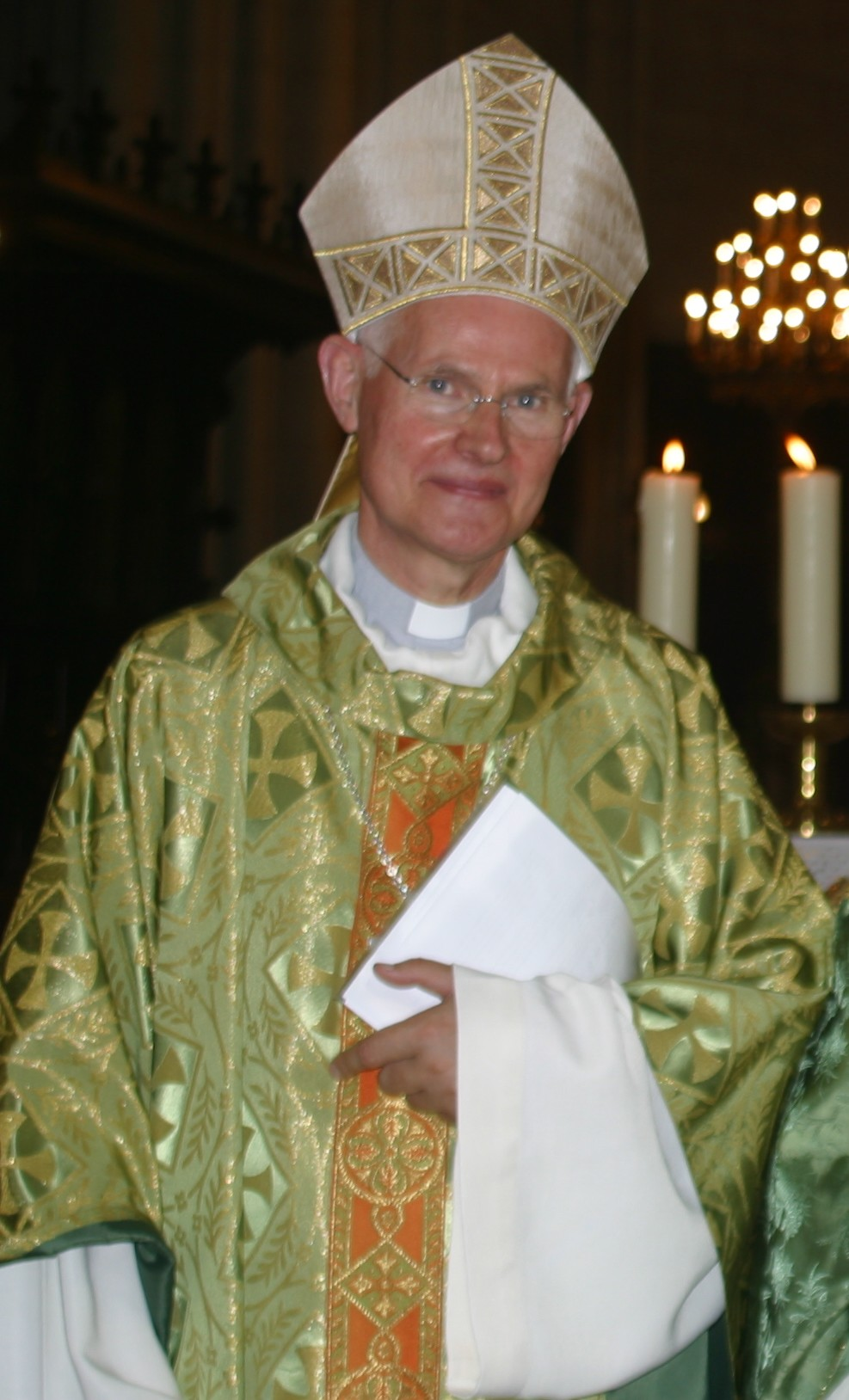
- Church: Roman Catholic Church
- See: Archdiocese of Montpellier
- Predecessor: Guy Marie Alexandre Thomazeau
- Previous post: Archbishop of Albi (2000–2010)

Orders
- Ordination: 7 September 1974
- Consecration: 8 October 2000 by Emile Marcus

Personal details
- Born: 22 April 1947 (age 79) Serques, France
- Coat of arms

Pierre-Marie Carré (born 22 April 1947) is a French prelate of the Catholic Church who was archbishop of Montpellier from 2011 to 2022, where he was first archbishop coadjutor for a year. He was archbishop of Albi from 2000 to 2010.

== Biography ==
Pierre-Marie Joseph Carré was born on 22 April 1947, in Serques, France. He attended the minor seminary of Bon Encontre, in the diocese of Agen. After earning a bachelor’s degree in 1966, he studied at the major seminary of Bordeaux, interrupting his studies to complete his military service. From October 1973 to May 1977, he studied theology at the Pontifical Gregorian University and sacred scripture at the Pontifical Biblical Institute.

He was ordained a priest on September 7, 1974, for the Diocese of Agen. In 1977 he was appointed professor of sacred scripture at the Interdiocesan Seminary of Bordeaux. In 1980 he became Rector of the Interdiocesan Seminary of Poitiers. From 1989 to 1993 he became rector in Bordeaux. Returning to Agen in 1993, he joined the Episcopal Council, then was appointed Episcopal Vicar responsible for priestly and lay formation, and parish priest of the Astaffort sector. In 1994 he became diocesan director of vocations as well.

In September 1995, Bishop Sabin-Marie Saint-Gaudens appointed him vicar general. He was elected diocesan administrator when Saint-Gaudens retired in 1996 and in 1997 was named vicar general again Jean-Charles Descubes.

On 13 July 2000, Pope John Paul II appointed him Archbishop of Albi. He received his episcopal consecration from Pope John Paul on 8 October 2000. While in Albi, he became head of the doctrinal commission of the Conference of French Bishops.

On 14 May 2010, Pope Benedict XVI named him Coadjutor Archbishop of Montpellier. On 5 January 2011, he was named a member of the Pontifical Council for the New Evangelization. On 3 June 2011 he became archbishop upon the retirement of his predecessor. On 22 October 2011, he was appointed the Secretary of the Special Assembly of the 2012 Synod of Bishops on the new evangelisation.

He was vice president of the Conference of French Bishops from 2013 to 2019.

Pope Francis accepted his resignation on 9 July 2022.

== See also ==
- Catholic Church in France
- List of the Roman Catholic dioceses of France
