= Aepeia =

Aepeia or Aipeia (Ancient Greek: Αἴπεια) may refer to:

- Aepeia (Cyprus), a town of ancient Cyprus
- Aepeia (Messenia), a town of ancient Messenia
- Aipeia, a modern town in Messenia named after the ancient town
