= Corone (Messenia) =

Town

Coordinates: 36°57′15″N 21°55′41″E

Corone or Korone (Ancient Greek: Κορώνη) was a town of ancient Messenia, situated upon the western side of the Messenian Gulf, which was sometimes called after it, the Coronaean. According to Pausanias, it was built on the site of the Homeric Aepeia, at the time of the restoration of the Messenians to their native country, by Epaminondas; and received the name of Coroneia because Epimelides, who founded the new town, was a native of Coroneia, in Boeotia. This name was changed by the Messenians into that of Corone. According to others, Corone corresponded to the Homeric Pedasus.

In the acropolis of the city was a brazen statue of Athena, who became the patron deity of Corone in consequence of her worship at Coroneia. In the agora there was a statue of Zeus Zoter, as at Messene; and there were likewise in the lower city temples of Artemis, of Dionysus, and of Asclepius. The harbour of Corone was called the port of the Achaeans, probably because the city belonged to the Achaean League.

Pausanias says that Corone was situated to the right of the Pamisus, close to the sea, and at the foot of a mountain called Temathia or Mathia (the reading is doubtful). The name of the mountain in the 19th century was Lykódimo, at the foot of which stands Petalidhi, on the site of Corone, in a small but fertile plain. The modern town of Koroni, named after the ancient one, however, is situated upon a promontory some distance south of Petalidhi, occupies the site of Asine. It is probable that the inhabitants of Corone migrated at some period to Asine, carrying with them their ancient name.

There are considerable remains of Corone. Part of a mole may still be traced jutting out into the sea, and in the plain have been found foundations of houses and walls, and some works of ancient art. There are likewise traces of the walls of the acropolis upon the heights above the plain.

Corone was supplied with water for drinking from the fountain Plataniston, which flowed from a hollow plane tree 20 stadia from the road, leading from the Pamisus. Eighty stadia south of Corone, near the coast, was the temple of Apollo Corynthus, the site of which is probably indicated by some ancient remains on the hill of St. Elias, near the sea, above the village of Kastélia.

Corone belonged to the Achaean League. According to Livy, it was on his march to relieve this city that Philopoemen was made prisoner, and put to death at Messene on the following day (183 BCE). Plutarch, however, relates that Philopoemen was captured on his march towards Colonis; but the statement of Livy is the more probable one. Corone is also mentioned by Ptolemy.

Its site is located near the modern Petalidi.
