= Antheia (Messenia) =

Town in ancient Messenia

Antheia (Ancient Greek: Ἄνθεια) was a town in ancient Messenia, mentioned in the Iliad by Homer, who gives it the epithet Βαθυγείμων. Homer says it was located in the high meadows between Pherae and Aipeia, and lists it as one of the towns with which Agamemnon wished to make atonement to Achilles. It was supposed by later writers to be the same as Thuria, though some identified it with Asine.

Some modern scholars treat the site as unlocated; others tentatively identify a location at 37°06′43″N 22°02′28″E.
