= Thuria =

Thuria may refer to:

- Thuria (Messenia), a town of ancient Messenia, Greece
- Thuria, Messenia, a modern town in Greece taking its name from the ancient town
- Thuria, the fictional Martian name of the Mars moon Phobos in the Barsoom novels by Edgar Rice Burroughs
- Thuria, a kingdom in the Pellucidar novels by Edgar Rice Burroughs
- Thuria, a fictional region used by Robert E. Howard in his Kull stories
