= Clarius =

Clarius can refer to:

- Apollo, Greek and Roman God
  - also known as Apollo Clarius, see Clarus
- Clarius, a small stream in Cyprus which ran near the town of Aepeia (Cyprus).
- Clarius also means "more brightly" in Latin
- Clarius or Pseudo-Clarius, monk once thought to be the author of the Chronicle of Saint-Pierre-le-Vif of Sens
- Isidorus Clarius, religious scholar
- Birgit Clarius, German heptathlete
- Clarius, a planet in the Clyph star system of the Milky Way Galaxy in the Marvel Universe (see Features of the Marvel Universe)

== See also ==
- Clarus (disambiguation)
- Clarias, fish family
