= Kolone =

Kolone may refer to:

- Kolone (Messenia), a town of ancient Messenia, Greece
- Jeremiah Kolone (born 1994), Samoan-American football player
- Va'ai Kolone (1911 – 2001), Prime Minister of Samoa
