= Boreasmi =

Ancient Greek festival

Boreasmi or Boreasmus (Ancient Greek: βορεασμοί) was a festival celebrated by the Athenians in honor of the god Boreas, the personification of the North Wind.

Little is known about the specifics of the Boreasmi festival, aside from the fact that it involved banquets. The festival did not gain widespread fame, as evidenced by Plato, who suggests that the location of Boreas' temple was not well known to Athenians.

== History ==
According to Herodotus, the festival was thought to have been instituted during the Persian Wars. The Athenians, following an oracle's command to summon their son-in-law as an ally, prayed to Boreas. Soon after, a strong north wind wrecked the fleet of the Persian king Xerxes near Cape Sepias. In gratitude, the Athenians built a temple to Boreas on the banks of the Ilisos River.

The association of Boreas with Athens predates the Persian Wars and was intimately connected with the early history of Attica. According to Greek tradition, Boreas carried off Oreithyia, the daughter of Erechtheus, king of Athens, and married her This event strengthened Boreas' ties with Athens, where he was regarded as a familial figure, often referred to as their brother-in-law. As a result, it is believed that Boreas was honored in Athens even before the Persian Wars.

== Other celebrations in Greece ==
Pausanias mentions that an annual festival dedicated to Boreas, featuring annual sacrifices, was held in Megalopolis. In this region, Boreas was venerated as the deliverer from the Lacedaemonians.

Similarly, the Thurians also celebrated Boreas with an annual sacrifice, as noted by Aelian. Boreas was credited with destroying the fleet of Dionysius of Syracuse, who had attacked the city. Aelian adds that the Thurians, in gratitude, decreed Boreas citizenship and assigned him a house and a plot of land. This may symbolically refer to the establishment of a temple and a piece of land dedicated to his worship.

== Bibliography ==
- Smith, William (1890). "Boreasmi". In Wayte, William; Marindin, G. E. (eds.). A Dictionary of Greek and Roman Antiquities.
- Plato. Phaedrus. p. 229.
- Herodotus. "189". In Godley, A. D. (ed.). The Histories. Book VII.
- Pausanias. "19". Description of Greece. Book I.
- Aelian. "12.61". In Hercher, Rudolf (ed.). Varia Historia. Book XII.
