= Laurent Percerou =

French bishop of the Catholic Church (born 1961)

- Bishop of Nantes
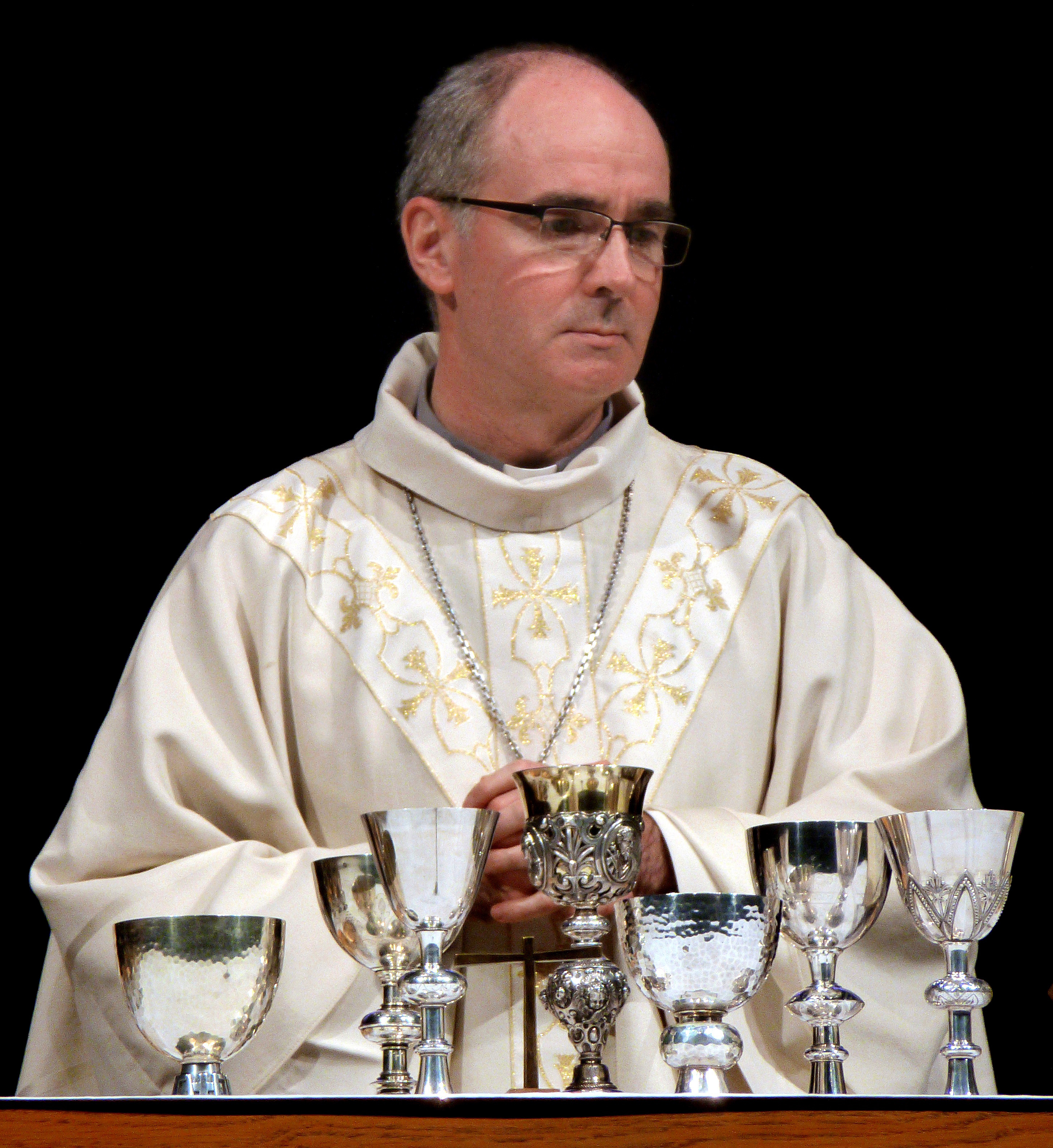
- Mgr Laurent Percerou in January 2015
- Diocese: Nantes
- See: Nantes
- Appointed: 11 August 2020
- Installed: 20 September 2020
- Predecessor: Jean-Paul James

Orders
- Ordination: 14 June 1992
- Consecration: 14 April 2013 by Hippolyte Louis Jean Simon

Personal details
- Born: 11 September 1961 (age 64) Dreux, France
- Denomination: Roman Catholic
- Coat of arms

Laurent Percerou (born 11 September 1961) is a French bishop of the Catholic Church who served as Bishop of Moulins from 2013 to 2020. He was named Bishop of Nantes on 11 August 2020.

== Bishop ==
Laurent Percerou was born on 11 September 1961 in Dreux, France. He studied history at the University of Tours and the seminary des Carmes in Paris. He studied philosophy and theology at the Institut Catholique de Paris, earning a licentiate in biblical and systematic theology. He also studied canon law at the University of Salamanca, Spain. He was ordained a priest of the Chartres on 14 June 1992.

He was a parish priest of Maintenon, Gallardon, and the parish grouping of Challet, Gallardon, Maintenon and Villiers-le-Mohier from 1993 to 2003; head of the diocesan service for vocations from 1995 to 2007; vicar general and moderator of the curia from 2003 to 2005; diocesan administrator from 2005 to 2006; and vicar general from 2006 to 2013.

Pope Benedict XVI named Percerou bishop of Moulins on 14 February 2013. He was consecrated a bishop on 14 April.

On 11 August 2020, Pope Francis appointed him Bishop of Nantes.

== See also ==
- Catholic Church in France
- List of the Roman Catholic dioceses of France
