= Georges Soubrier =

French Roman Catholic bishop (born 1933)

The Most Reverend Georges Soubrier P.S.S.
- Bishop emeritus of Nantes
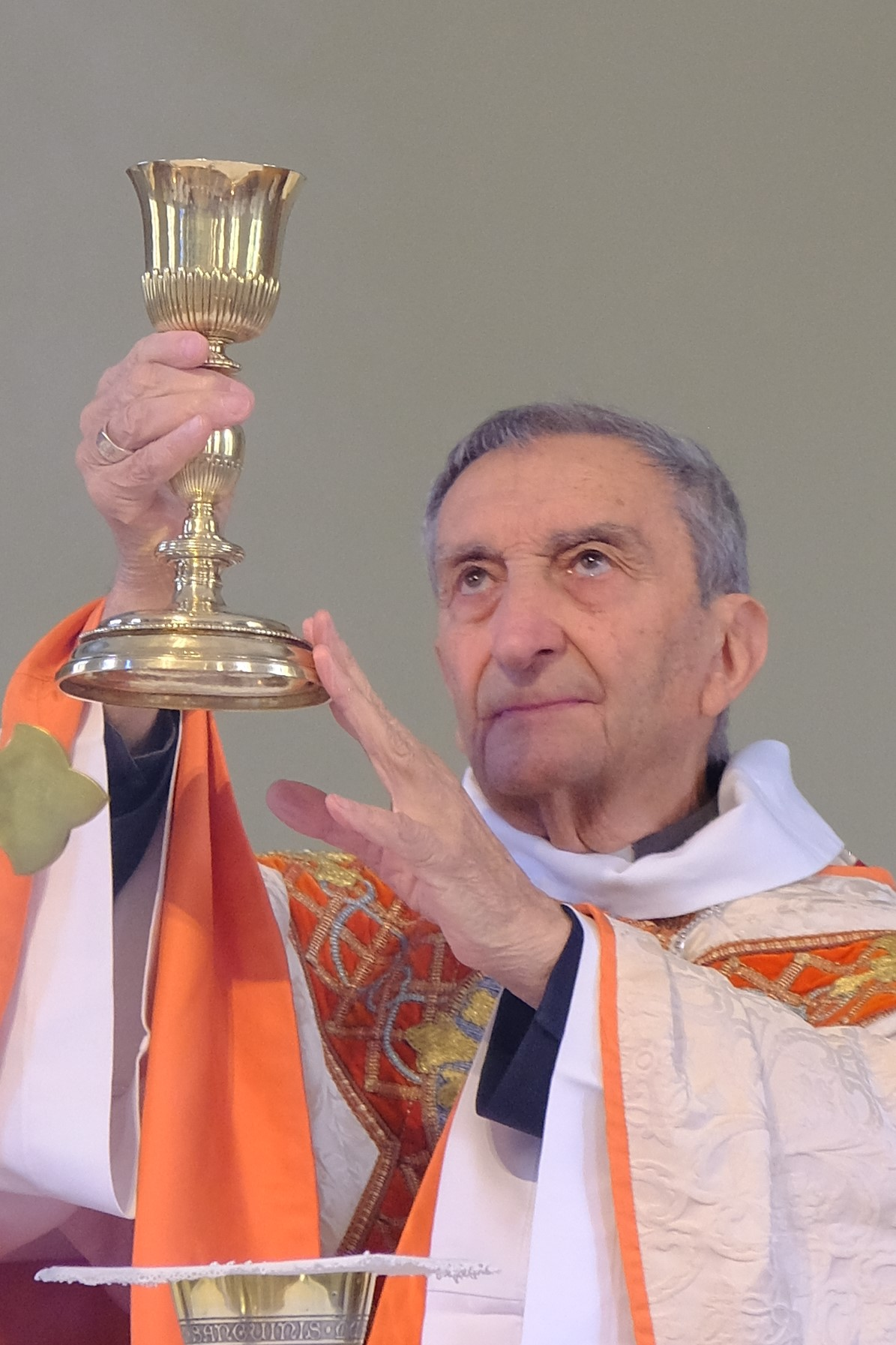
- Bishop Soubrier in 2022
- Church: Catholic Church
- Diocese: Nantes
- See: Nantes
- Appointed: 10 October 1996
- Term ended: 8 July 2009
- Predecessor: Émile Marcus
- Successor: Jean-Paul James
- Other posts: Titular Bishop of Acholla (1988–1996); Auxiliary Bishop of Paris (1988–1996)

Orders
- Ordination: 29 June 1960 by Jean-Ernest Ménard
- Consecration: 14 October 1988 by Jean-Marie Lustiger

Personal details
- Born: Georges Pierre Soubrier; 20 November 1933 (age 92) Thérondels, Aveyron, France
- Education: Institut Catholique de Paris

Georges Pierre Soubrier P.S.S. (born 20 November 1933) is a French Roman Catholic prelate who served as bishop of Nantes from 1996 to 2009. He previously served as an auxiliary bishop of Paris and titular bishop of Acholla from 1988 to 1996. He is a member of the Society of Priests of Saint-Sulpice.

== Early life and priesthood ==
Soubrier was born on 20 November 1933 in Thérondels, in the Aveyron department of southern France. He was ordained a priest for the Diocese of Rodez on 29 June 1960 by Bishop Jean-Ernest Ménard.

In 1961 he entered the Society of the Priests of Saint Sulpice. He subsequently devoted much of his priestly ministry to the education and formation of seminarians. From 1963 to 1966 he was professor of philosophy at the interdiocesan seminary of the Midi-Pyrénées region. He served as superior of its first-cycle seminary from 1966 to 1972, superior of the second-cycle Saint-Sulpice Seminary at Issy-les-Moulineaux from 1972 to 1983, and superior of the Carmes Seminary of the Institut Catholique de Paris from 1983 to 1988.

== Episcopal ministry ==
On 25 June 1988, Soubrier was appointed auxiliary bishop of Paris and titular bishop of Acholla. He was consecrated a bishop on 14 October 1988 at Notre-Dame de Paris by Cardinal Jean-Marie Lustiger, Archbishop of Paris, with Émile Marcus, P.S.S., and Roger Joseph Bourrat as co-consecrators.

Soubrier served as auxiliary bishop of Paris for eight years. During this period he also held responsibilities within the French Bishops' Conference, including work concerning young people and ecclesial ministry.

=== Bishop of Nantes ===
On 10 October 1996, Soubrier was appointed bishop of Nantes, succeeding Émile Marcus. He served as bishop for thirteen years. During his episcopate he promoted pastoral initiatives directed toward young people, including the Happy Day gatherings held in 2006 and 2009, each of which brought together more than 2,000 young people. He also recalled large diocesan Pentecost gatherings that attracted approximately 20,000 participants during the Jubilee year 2000 and in 2009.

In June 2007, Soubrier was appointed a Chevalier of the Légion d'honneur in recognition of his engagement in civil society.

=== Retirement ===
Having reached the canonical retirement age of 75, Soubrier submitted his resignation as bishop of Nantes. On 8 July 2009, Pope Benedict XVI accepted his resignation under canon 401 §1 of the Code of Canon Law and appointed Jean-Paul James, then bishop of Beauvais, as his successor.

After leaving Nantes, Soubrier returned to the Society of Saint-Sulpice and lived at the Foyer de la Solitude in Issy-les-Moulineaux. He described his post-retirement ministry as consisting principally of spiritual accompaniment, spiritual animation and retreats.

In July 2025, Soubrier presided at Mass during a summer gathering of the Communauté Chrétienne Aveyronnaise de Paris in Rignac. The organizers described him as bishop emeritus of Nantes and a native of Thérondels.

Catholic Church titles
Preceded by Émile Marcus	Bishop of Nantes; 1996–2009	Succeeded by Jean-Paul James
