= Clair of Nantes =

French Catholic bishop and saint

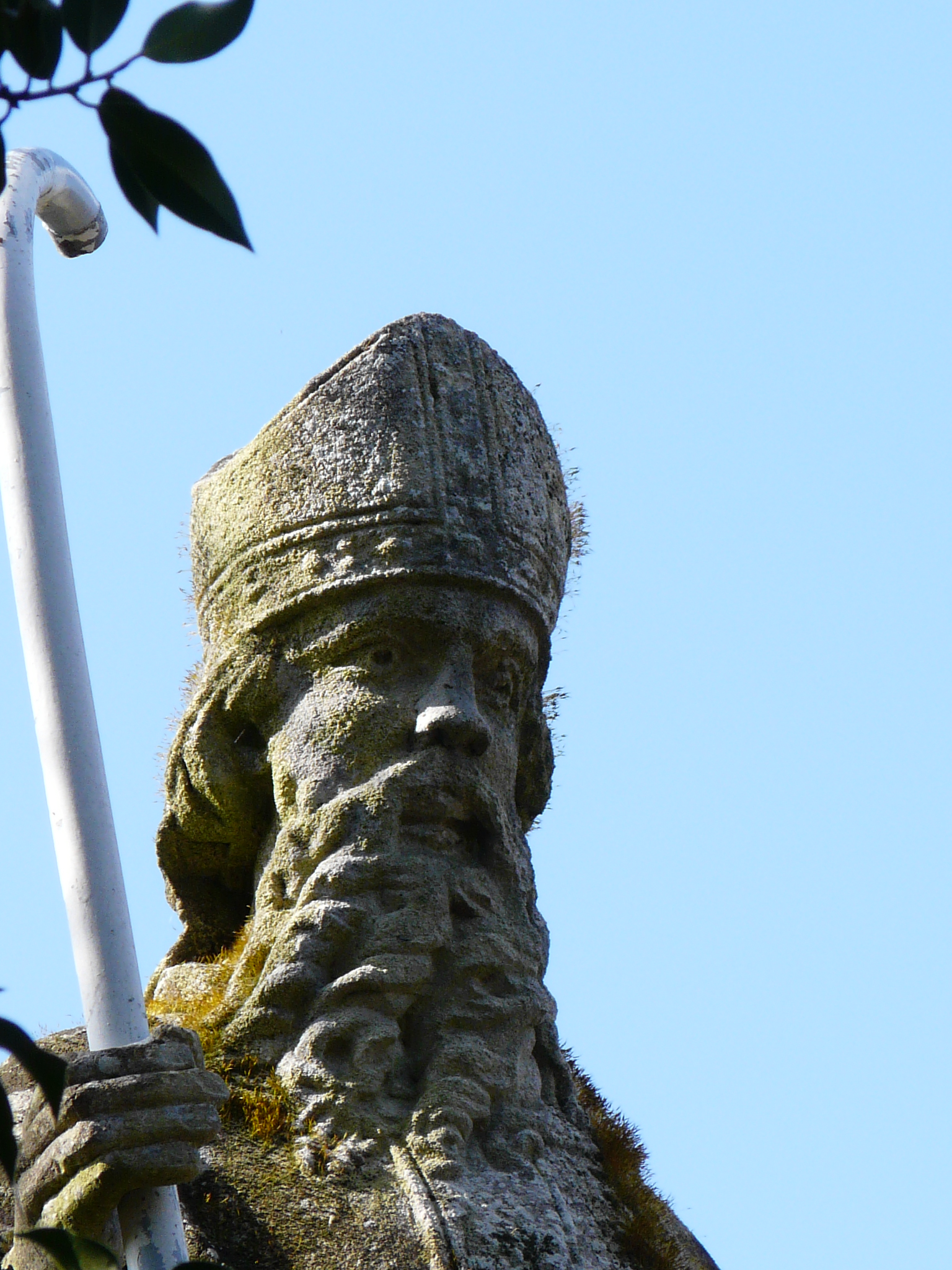
Statue of Clair at Nantes Cathedral

According to late traditions, Clair (Latin: Clarus) was the first bishop of Nantes, France in the late 3rd century. He is venerated as a saint in the Catholic Church.

== Traditional account ==
According to the traditional account, Clair was sent to Nantes by Pope Linus, the successor of Peter, seventy years after the birth of Christ. He arrived from Rome, with a nail in his possession from the cross that bore the martyrdom of Peter. Then he built an oratory dedicated to the apostle, which would later become Nantes Cathedral. He died in Kerbellec, village commune Réguiny (Morbihan), and his tomb (emptied since the Norman invasions in late 9th century) lies in a chapel adjoining the church of Réguiny. A votive fountain is also located on the territory of the Breton town.

He is sometimes confused with the fifth-century Clair of Aquitaine, considered the first bishop of Albi, whose relics lie in the Cathédrale Sainte-Cécile d'Albi.

== Critique ==
However, Breton historian Arthur Le Moyne de La Borderie makes the following points:

- that the ritual of the Church of Nantes, drawn up by precentor Helius in 1263, ignores the apostolic mission of Clarus;
- that Peter's nail in the cathedral of Nantes was not brought thither by Clarus, but at a time subsequent to the invasions of the Northmen in the tenth century;
- that Felix of Nantes, writing with six other bishops in 567 to Radegond, attribute to Martin of Vertou the chief rôle in the conversion of the Nantais to Christianity; and
- that the traditions concerning the mission of Clarus are later than 1400.

According to French historian Georges Goyau, the earliest list of the bishops of Nantes (made, according to historian Louis Duchesne, at the beginning of the tenth century) does not favour the thesis of a bishop of Nantes prior to Constantine. The dates regarding Clarus are uncertain.

== Background ==
During the mid-seventeenth century, the Estates of Brittany were in frequent conflict with the court in Paris over what they considered infringements on Breton autonomy. In 1636, Dominican Albert Le Grand published Le vies des saints de la Bretagne Armorique. While not necessarily a strong Breton patriot, the Estates saw things otherwise, as, to them, Le Grand's book reinforced the ancient prerogatives of Brittany. However, Le Grand drew a distinction between the seven dioceses founded by British Saints and the more eastern dioceses of Rennes and Nantes, founded by Gallo-Frankish saints.

One year later, Pierre Biré published Concernant l'Origine, Antiquité, Noblesse, & Saincteté de la Bretagne Armorique, & particulerement de ville de Nantes & Renne. In this, Biré said that Clair's mission as the first bishop of Nantes and all of Brittany preceded that of St. Denis to France; and it was from Nantes that St. Clair evangelized all of Brittany.

== Gallery ==
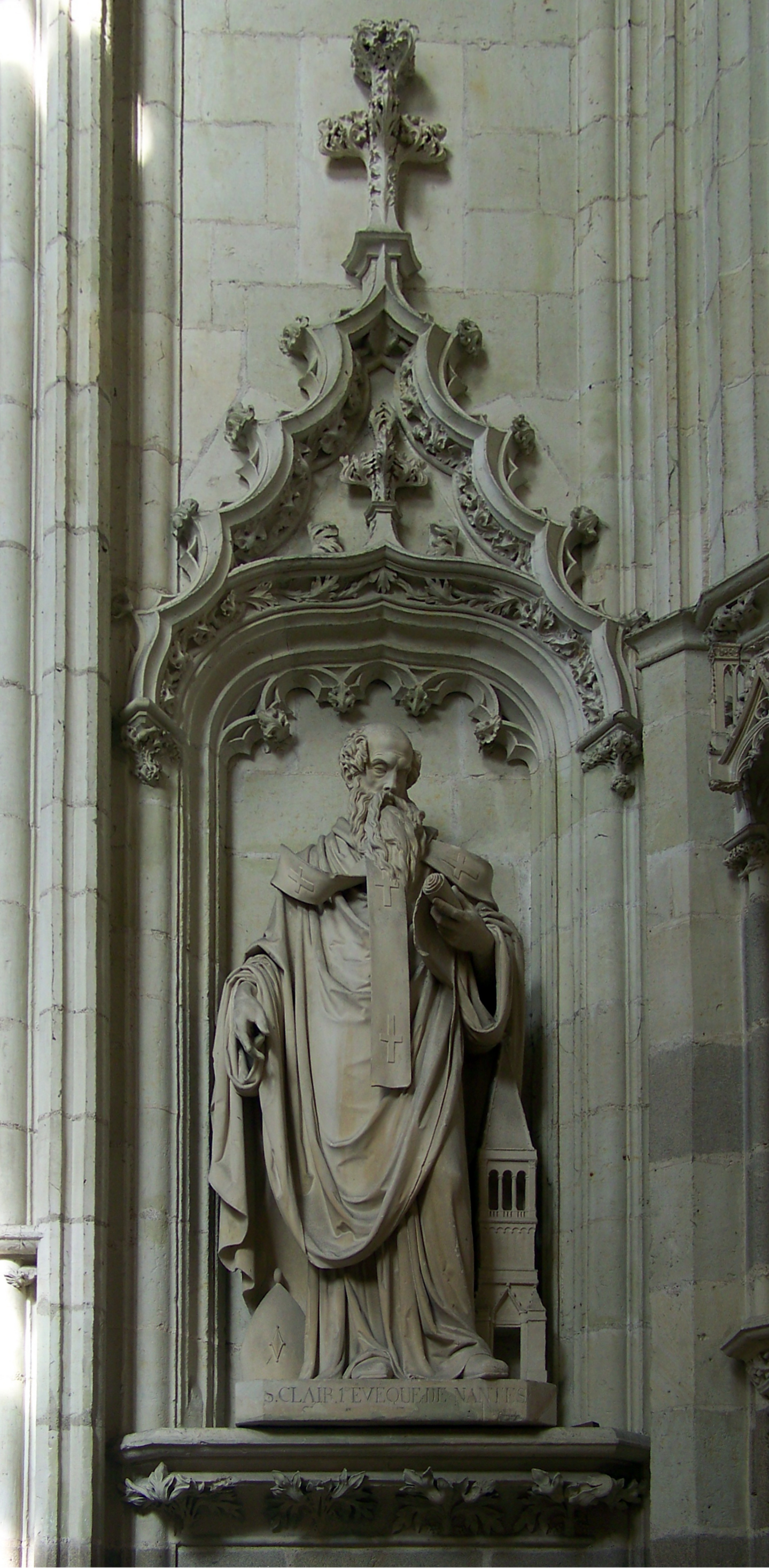
Cathédrale de Nantes

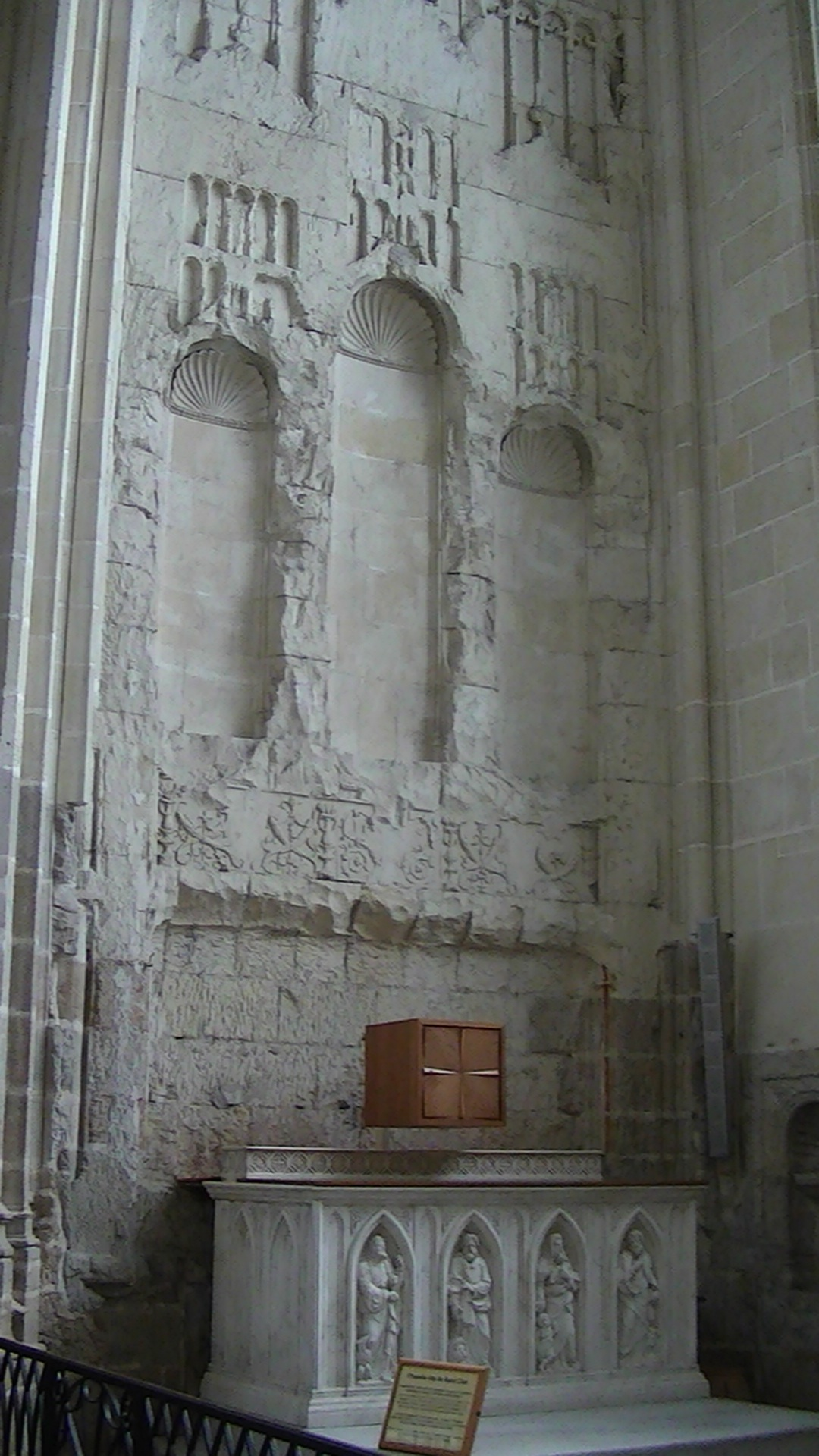
Nantes Cathedral chapel of St. Clair

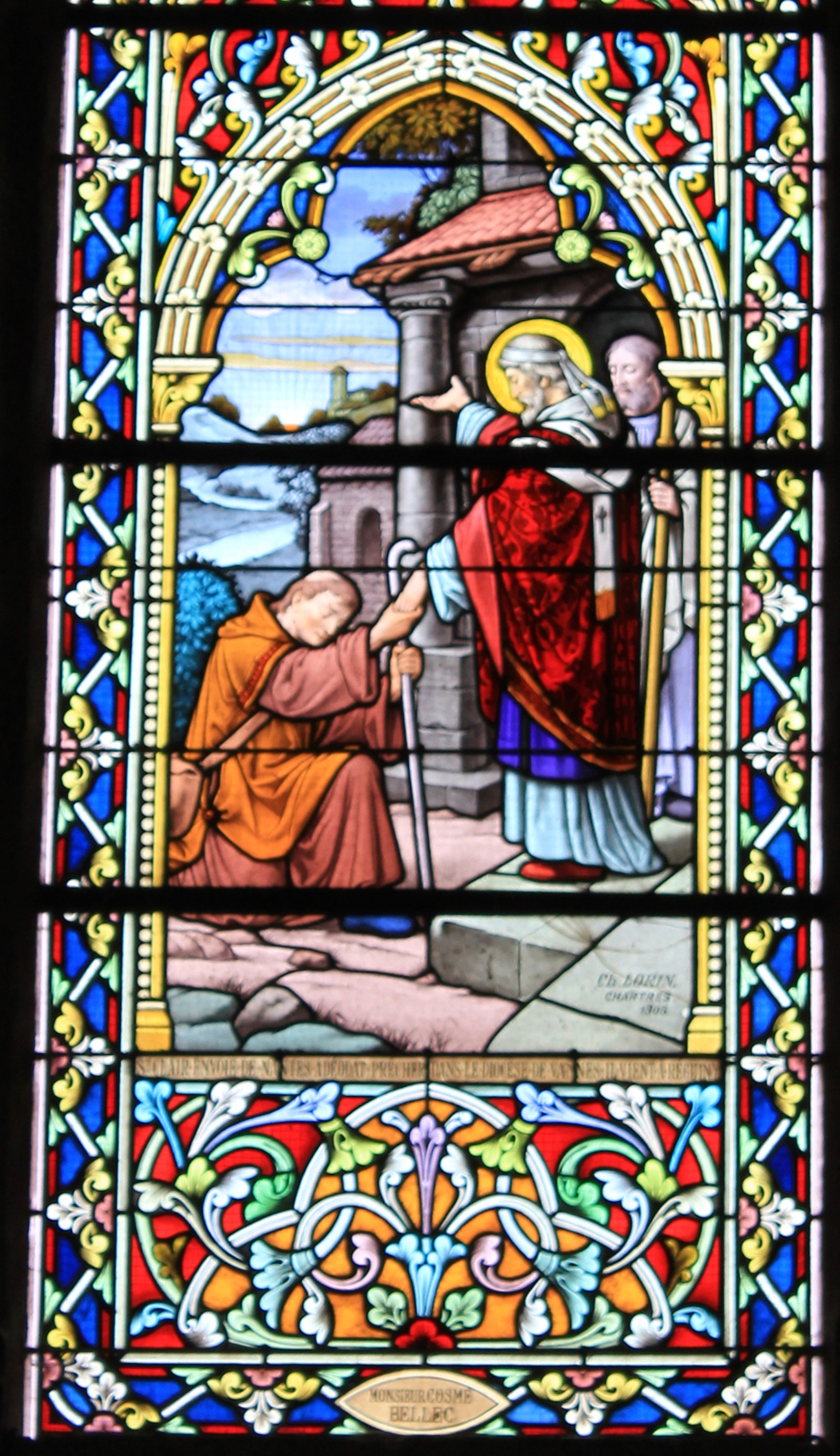
Église Saint-Clair (Réguiny)

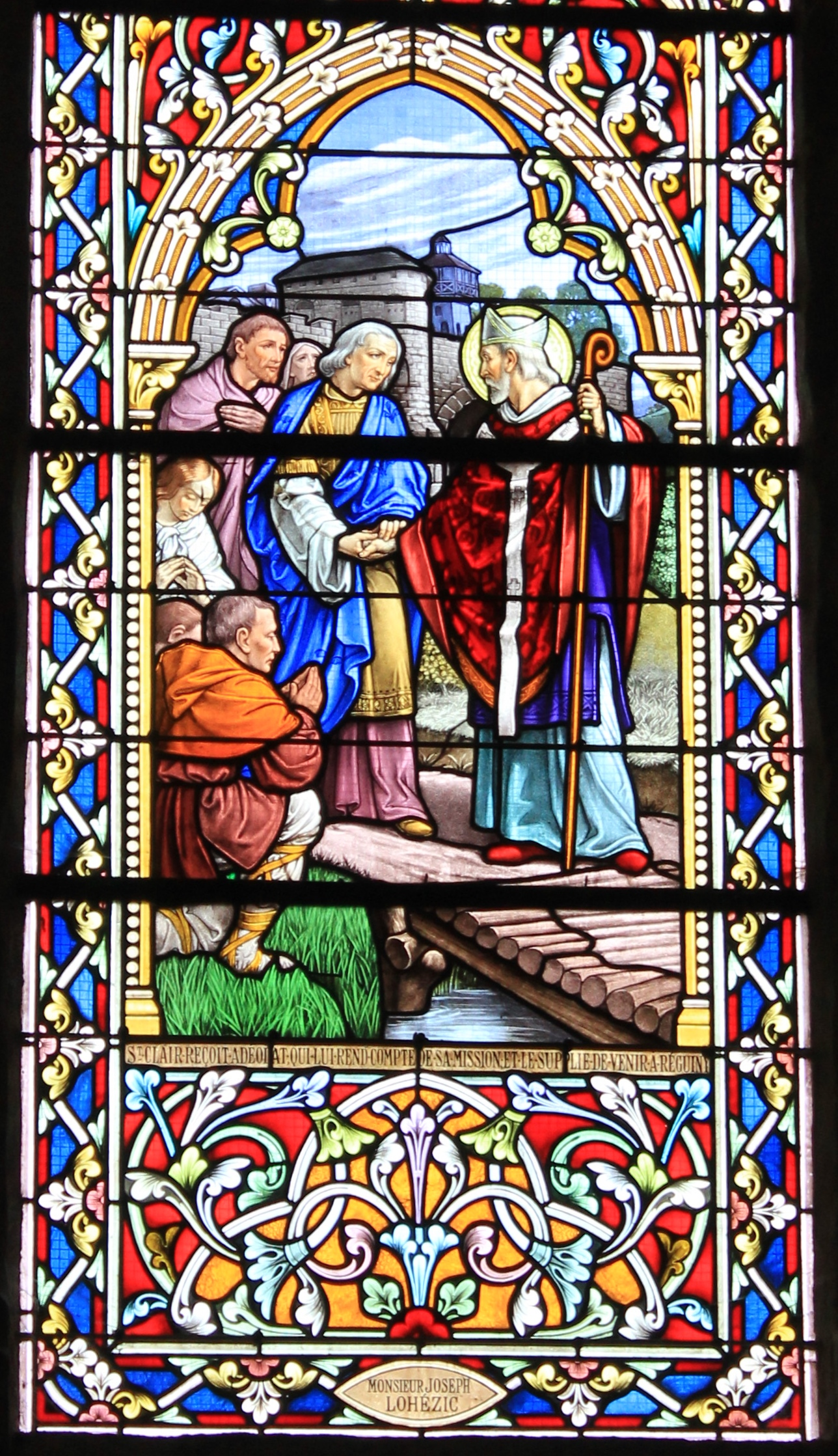
Église Saint-Clair (Réguiny)

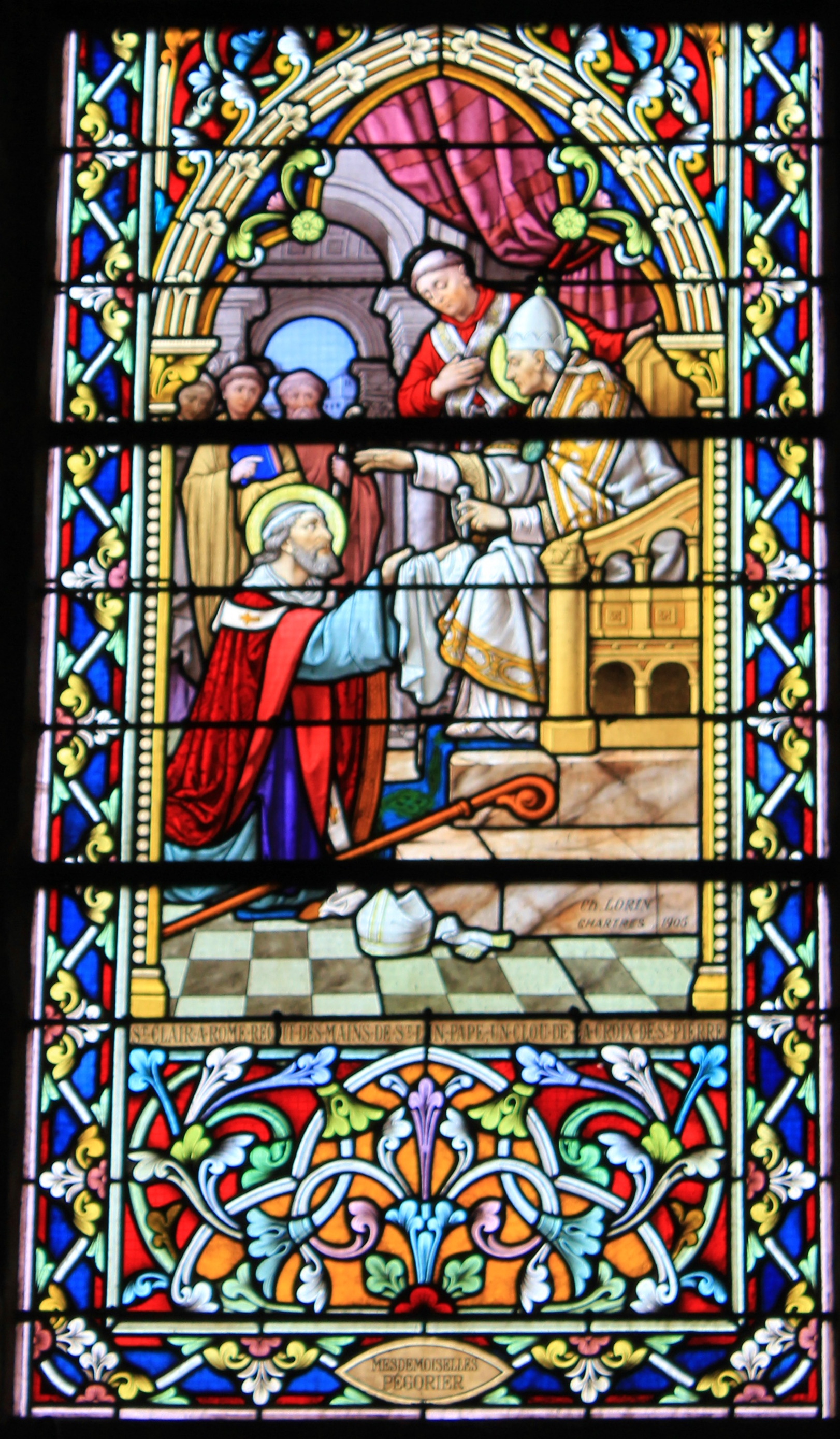
Église Saint-Clair (Réguiny)

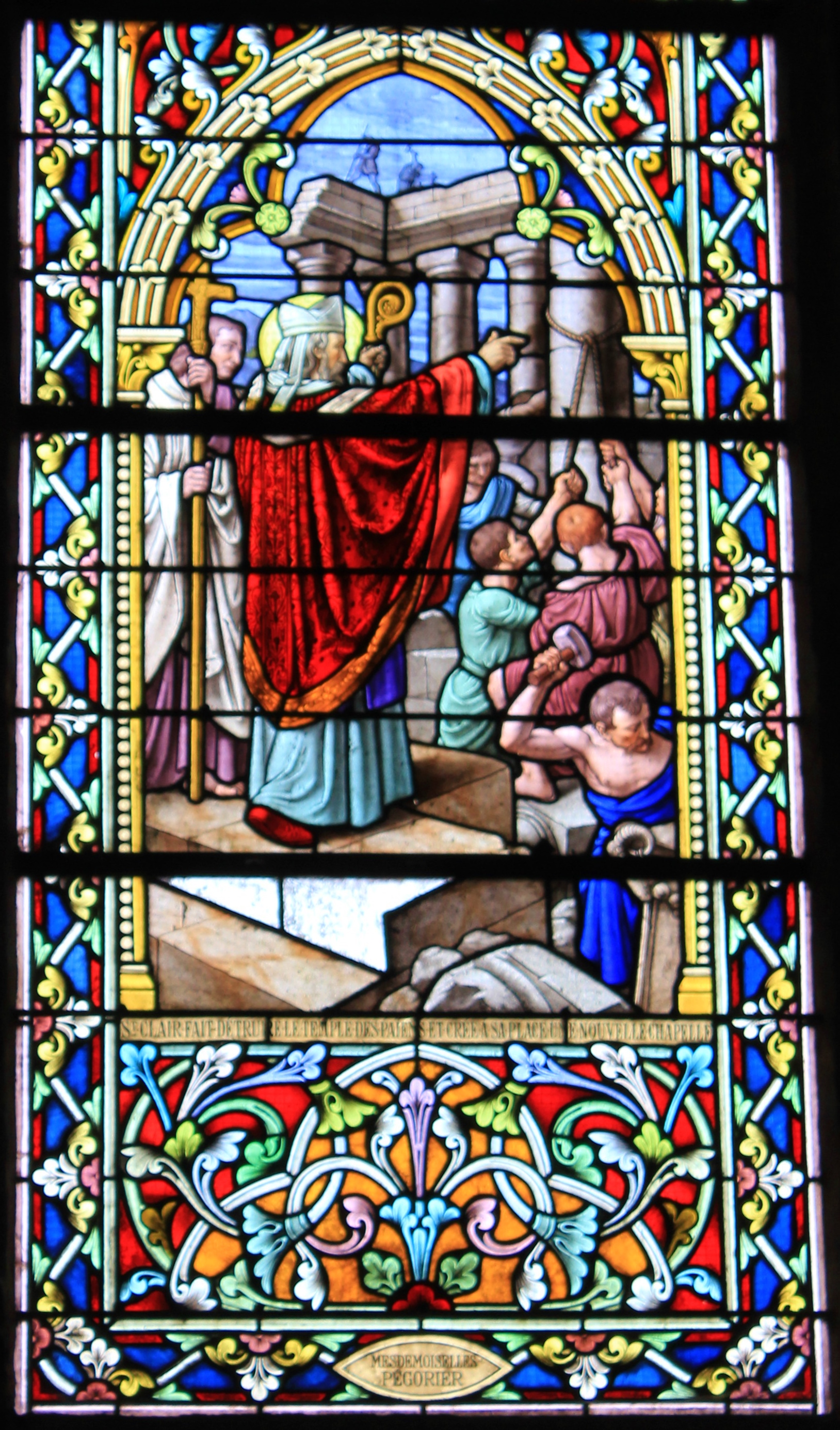
Église Saint-Clair (Réguiny)

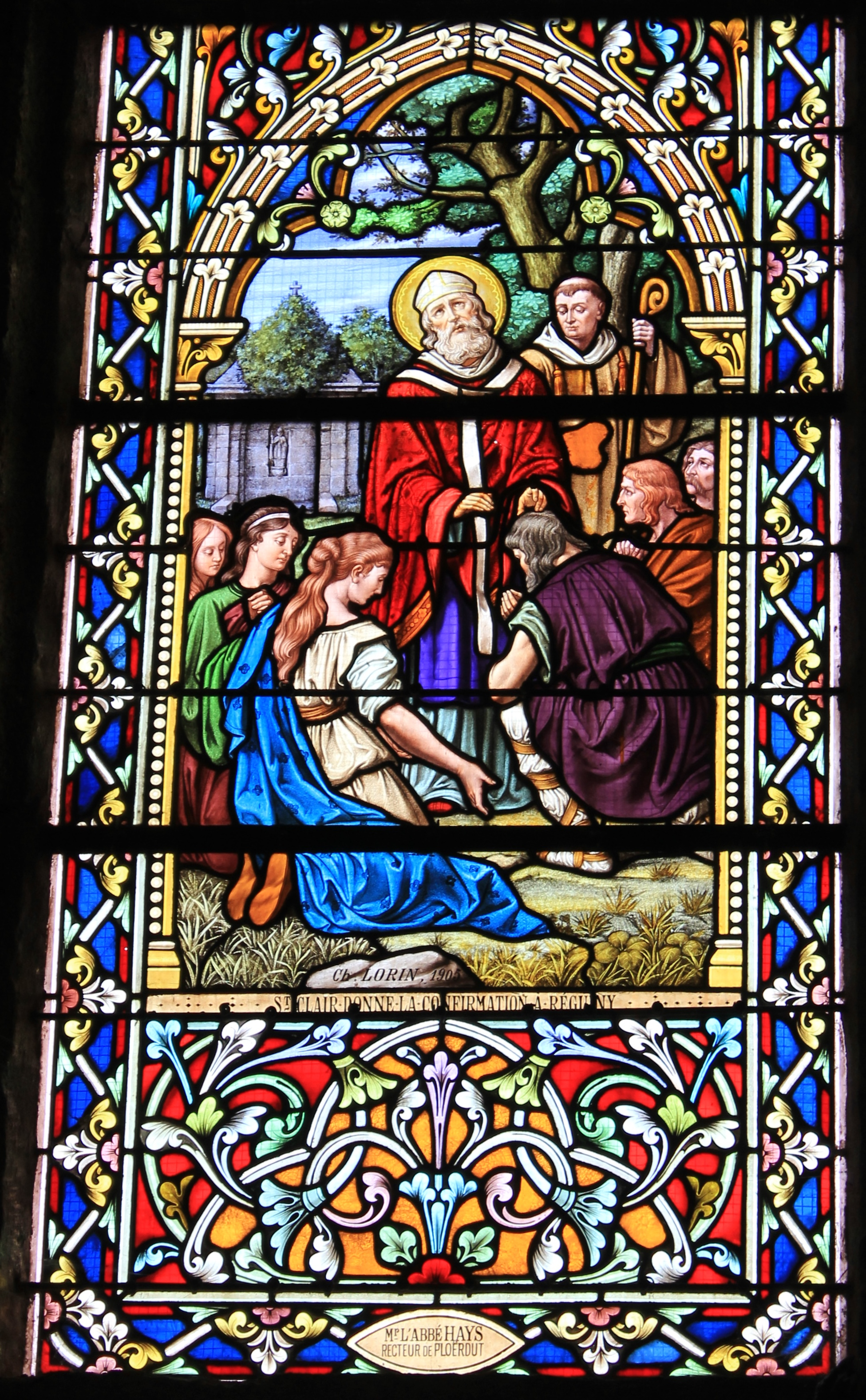
Église Saint-Clair (Réguiny)

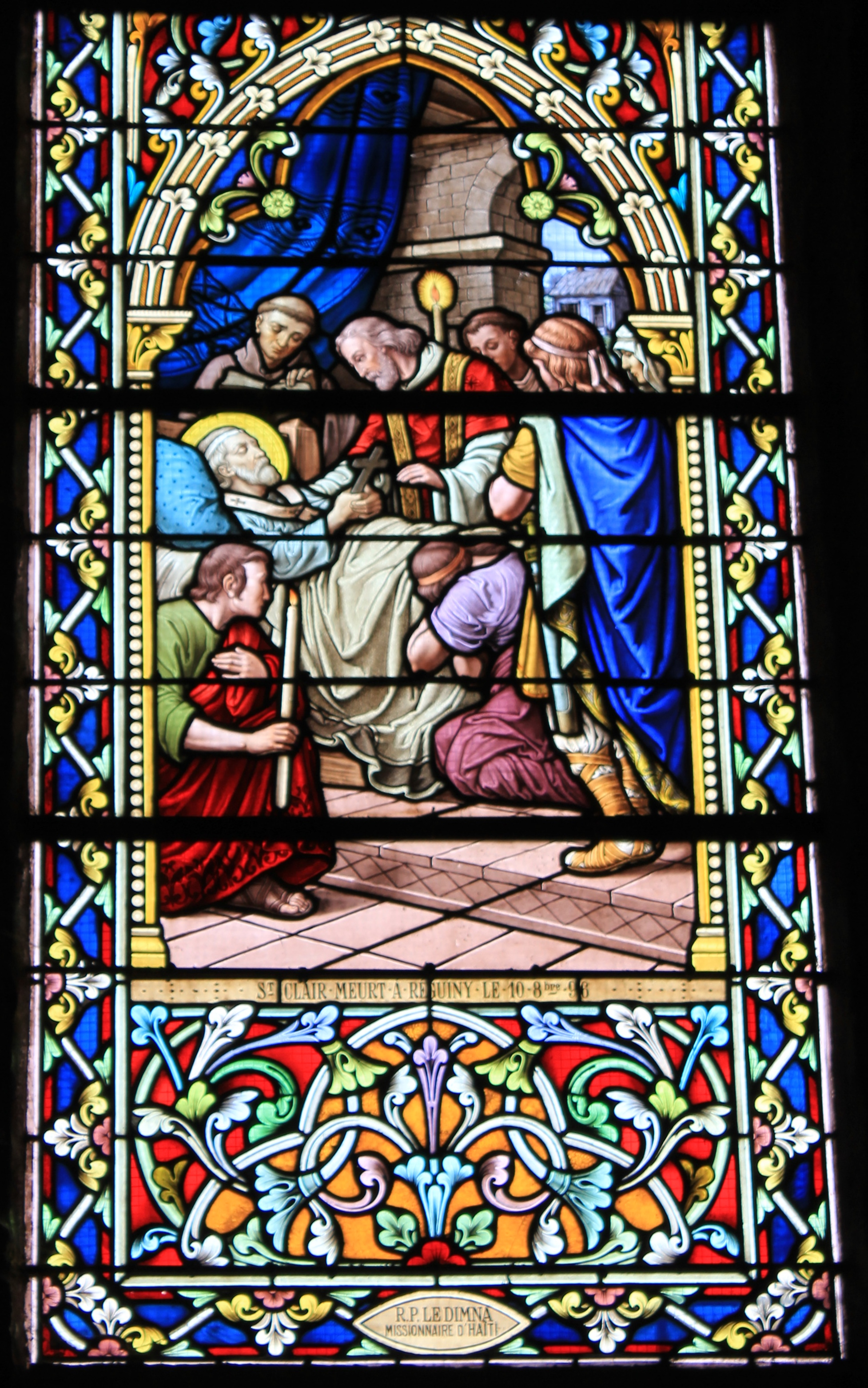
Église Saint-Clair (Réguiny)

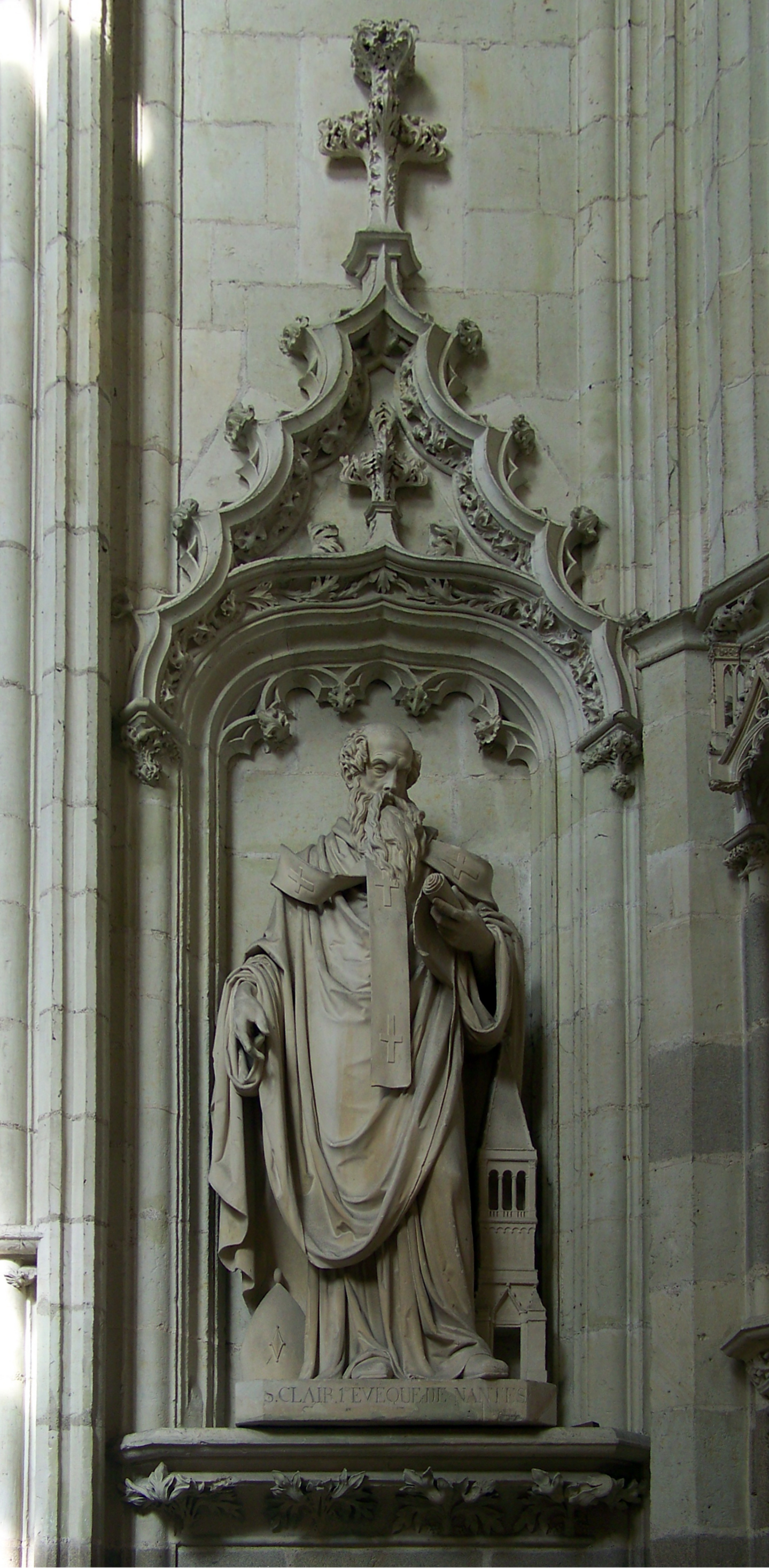
Église Saint-Clair (Réguiny)

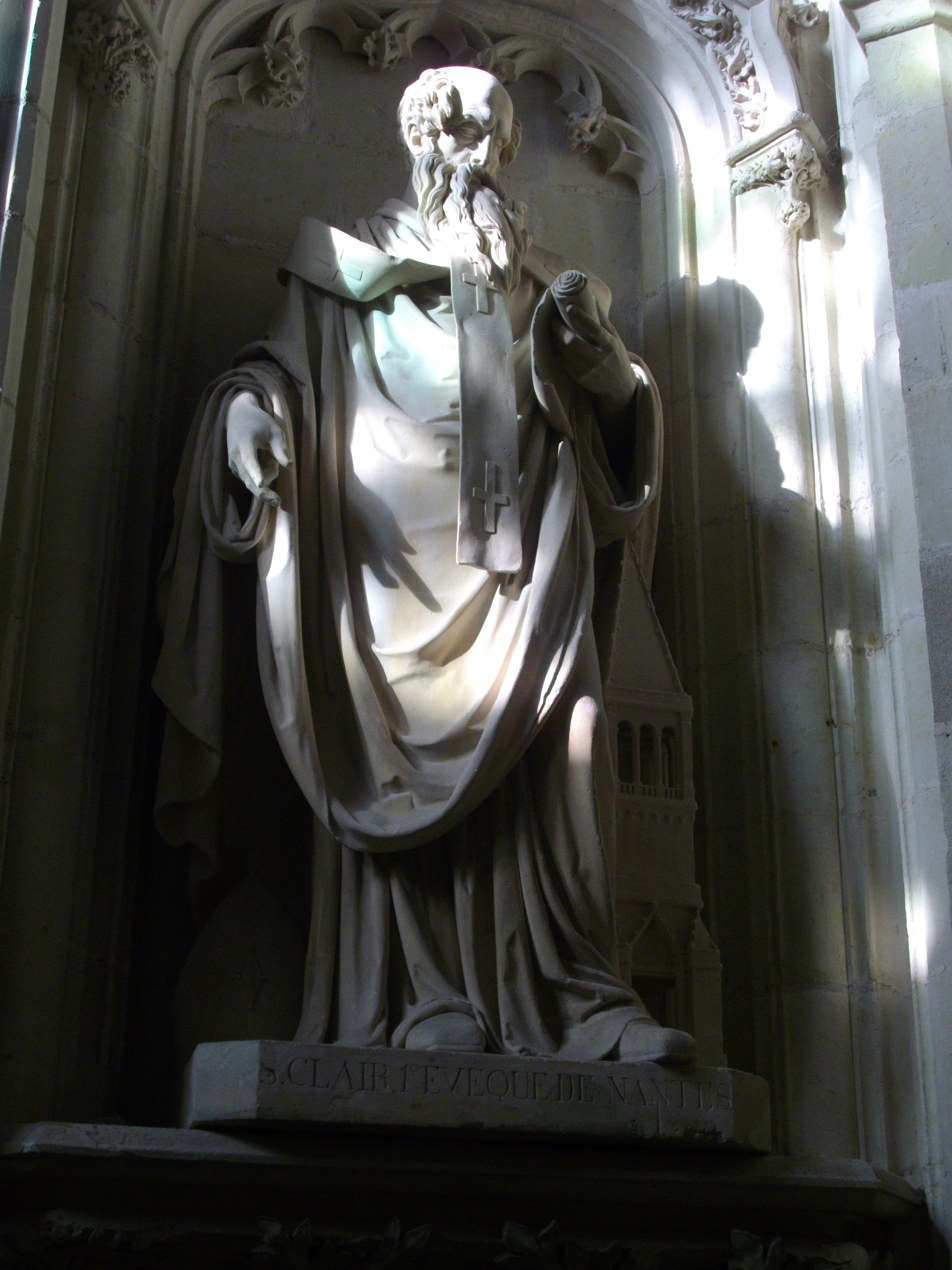
Cathédrale de Nantes

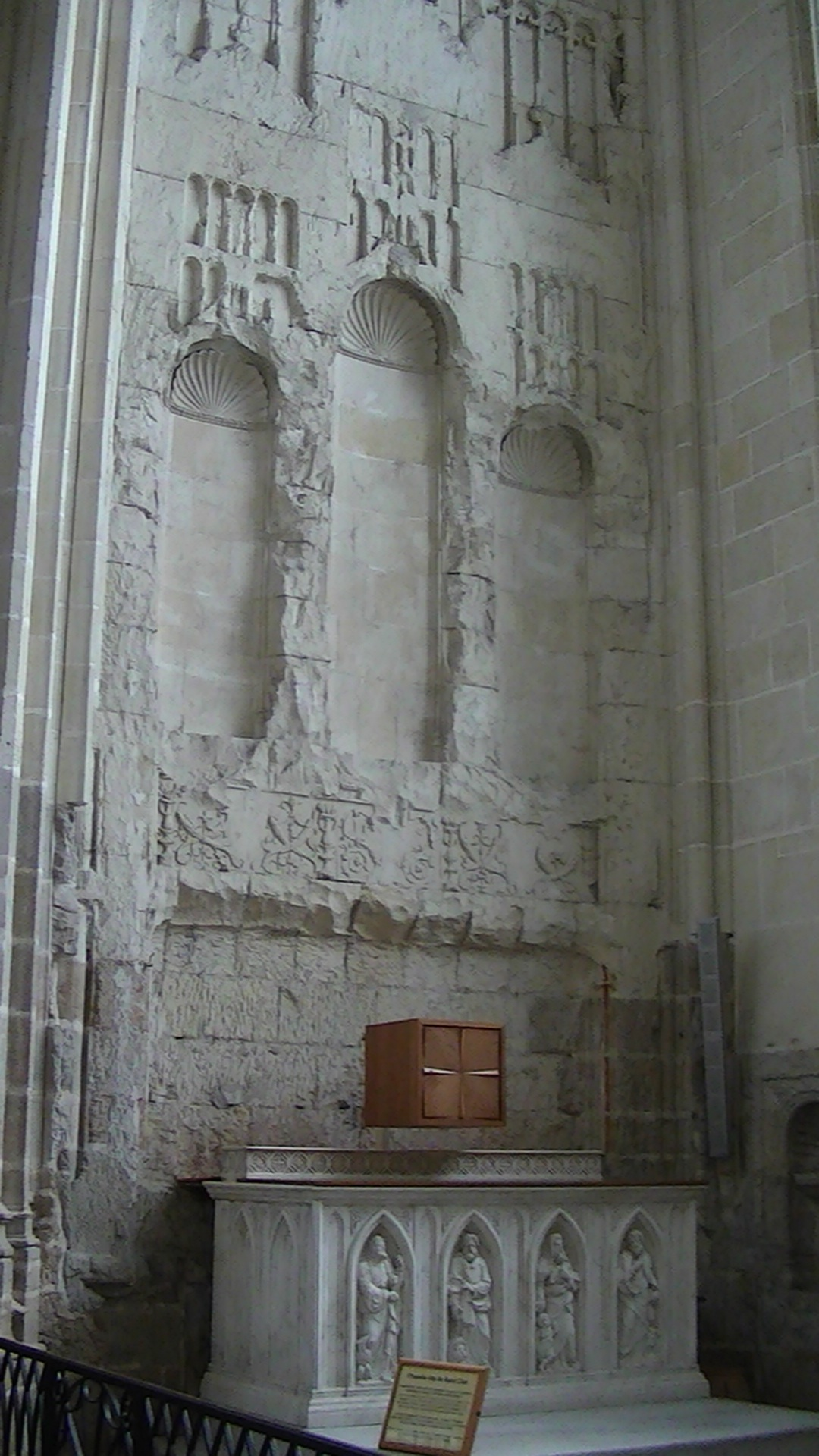
chapel of St. Clair, Nantes Cathedral
