= Diocese of Nantes =

Diocese of the Roman Catholic Church in Nantes, France

Coordinates: 47.22°N 1.55°W

Diocese of Nantes Dioecesis Nannetensis Diocèse de Nantes Eskopti Naoned

Catholic
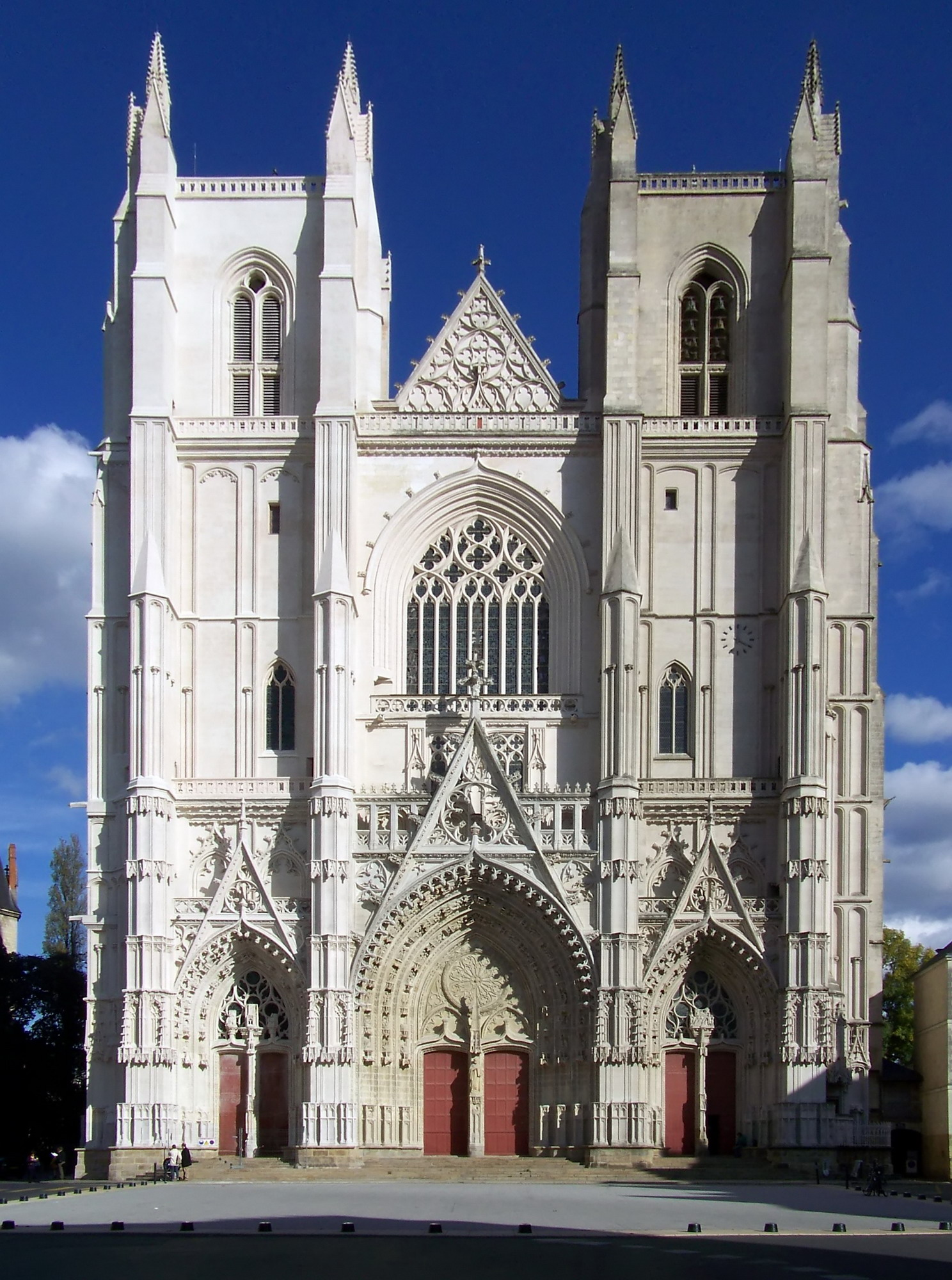
- Nantes Cathedral

Location
- Country: France
- Ecclesiastical province: Rennes
- Metropolitan: Archdiocese of Rennes, Dol, and Saint-Malo

Statistics
- Area: 6,980 km^{2} (2,690 sq mi)
- Population: Total; Catholics: (as of 2021); 1,441,302; 1,064,600 (73.9%)
- Parishes: 73 'new parishes'

Information
- Denomination: Roman Catholic
- Sui iuris church: Latin Church
- Rite: Roman Rite
- Established: 4th Century
- Cathedral: Cathedral of St. Peter in Nantes
- Patron saint: St. Donatian and St. Rogatian
- Secular priests: 232 (Diocesan) ▼48 (Religious Orders); 69 Permanent Deacons ▲

Current leadership
- Pope: Leo XIV
- Bishop: Laurent Percerou
- Metropolitan Archbishop: Pierre d'Ornellas
- Bishops emeritus: Georges Soubrier, P.S.S.

Map

Website
- Website of the Diocese

The Diocese of Nantes (Latin: Dioecesis Nannetensis; French: Diocèse de Nantes; Breton: Eskopti Naoned) is a Latin Church diocese of the Catholic Church in Nantes, France. The diocese consists of the department of Loire-Atlantique. It has existed since the 4th century. It is now suffragan of the Archdiocese of Rennes, Dol, and Saint-Malo, having previously been suffragan to the Archdiocese of Tours. The seat of the bishop is the Cathedral of Ste. Pierre in the city of Nantes.

In 2021, in the Diocese of Nantes there was one priest for every 3,802 Catholics.

== History ==
According to late traditions, Saint Clarus (Saint Clair), first Bishop of Nantes, was a disciple of Saint Peter. Arthur Le Moyne de La Borderie, however, has shown that the ritual of the Church of Nantes, drawn up by Helias the precentor in 1263, ignores the apostolic mission of Clarus, and also that Saint Peter's nail in Nantes Cathedral was not brought there by Clarus, but at a time subsequent to the invasions of the Northmen in the 10th century. He showed further that Felix of Nantes, writing with six other bishops in 567 to Saint Radegund, attributed to Martin of Vertou the chief role in the conversion of the Nantais to Christianity, and that the traditions concerning the mission of Clarus are later than 1400.

The earliest list of the bishops of Nantes (made, according to Louis Duchesne, at the beginning of the 11th century) does not favour the thesis of a bishop of Nantes prior to Constantine I. The author of the Passion of Donatian and Rogatian, martyrs of Nantes, places their death in the reign of Constantius Chlorus, and seems to believe that Rogatian could not be baptized, because the bishop was absent. Duchesne believes that the two saints suffered at an earlier date, and disputes the inference of the ancient writer concerning the absence of the bishop. The first bishop of Nantes whose date is certain is Desiderius (453), correspondent of Sulpicius Severus and Paulinus of Nola. The Saint Aemilianus supposed to have been Bishop of Nantes in Charlemagne's reign and to have fought the Saracens in Burgundy is considered legendary.

Among the noteworthy bishops is Felix (550–583), whose municipal improvements at Nantes were praised in the poems of Venantius Fortunatus, and who often mediated between the people of Brittany and the Frankish kings. Bishop Gohardus was killed by the Northmen in 843, with the monks of the monastery of Aindre.

Another was Bishop Actardus (843–871), who was driven out of his see by Prince Nominoe (d. 851) because he opposed Nominoe's moves to make himself king of Brittany and dominate the church in northwestern France. Nominoe attempted to create a new ecclesiastical province, depose opposition bishops, and create new dioceses, separate from the province of Tours and centered on Dol. With regard to his interference at Nantes, Nominoe received a sharp letter from Pope Leo IV, exhorting him to cease his support of his usurper Gislard, and support the true bishop, Actardus. During his son's reign, the Breton prince, in his conflict with the metropolitan see of Tours, created a see at Guérande c. 853, and filled it with the deposed usurper of the see of Nantes, who had been expelled. in favour of Gislard, an ecclesiastic of Vannes who had usurped the see of Nantes, at the western end of the diocese of Nantes.

Another notable bishop was the preacher Philippe Cospeau (1621–1636), who had been a professor at the Sorbonne and at the University of Paris.

Françoise d'Amboise (1427–1485), who became Duchess of Brittany in 1450, rebuilt the choir of the collegiate church of Notre-Dame, and founded at Nantes the monastery of the Poor Clares; she had a share in the canonization of Saint Vincent Ferrer (1455–1456), and was given one of the saint's fingers as a memento. Widowed in 1457, she resisted the intrigues of Louis XI, who urged her to contract a second marriage, and even attempted to persuade her personally during a pilgrimage to Redon in the Spring of 1462; she sought refuge in Nantes; in 1468 she became a Carmelite nun at Vannes. In 1477, at the request of Sixtus IV, she restored the Benedictine monastery of Couëts, near Nantes.

Gilles de Rais, marshall of France, executed in 1440 in the castle of Nantes, was buried in the chapel of the Carmelite house in Nantes.

=== Chapter and cathedral ===
The cathedral in Nantes is dedicated to Saint Peter. It was begun by Bishop Eumelius, and completed by Bishop Felix, who consecrated it in 568. It was destroyed by the Northmen. The first stone of a new cathedral was laid by Duke Jean V of Brittany on 14 April 1434. Building went slowly. The vaults of the nave were begun only in 1628. The choir screen was built between 1622 and 1659. The sacristy was added in 1772.

The mausoleum of Francis II, Duke of Brittany in the cathedral, executed in 1507 by Michel Colomb, is one of the finest monuments of the Renaissance.

The cathedral is staffed and administered by a corporation called the Chapter. It originally consisted of six dignitaries (the Dean, the Grand-Archdeacon, the Archdeacon of the Mée, the Cantor, the Treasurer, and the Scholasticus) and fourteen canons. Bishop Brice created seven canonicates on 2 August 1137. The deanship was founded c. 1307, by Bishop Daniel Vigier. The cantorship was established by Pope Pius II in 1460. The scholasticus was founded on July 1471, and the office of penitentiary around 1630. The Dean and the canon of La Psallette are appointed by the bishop. All the others are appointed alternatively by the Pope and the bishop.

=== Councils and synods ===
A diocesan synod was an irregularly held, but important, meeting of the bishop of a diocese and his clergy. Its purpose was (1) to proclaim generally the various decrees already issued by the bishop; (2) to discuss and ratify measures on which the bishop chose to consult with his clergy; (3) to publish statutes and decrees of the diocesan synod, of the provincial synod, and of the Holy See.

Councils were held at Nantes, in 600 and 1127. A provincial council was held at Nantes by Archbishop Vincent de Pirmil of Tours on the Tuesday after the Feast of Ss. Peter and Paul (29 June) in 1264; it issued nine canons.

Bishop Daniel Vigier (1304–1337) established a regulation, stating that there would be a general synod every year at Pentecost, and study conferences for clergy on the Feast of St. Luke (18 October), at Christmas, and during Lent.

Bishop Jean de Montrelais (1384–1391) held a diocesan synod in 1387, and published statutes. At Pentecost 1389, Bishop Jean de Montrelais held a diocesan synod, and published twenty statutes. In September 1389, Bishop Jean held a diocesan synod, and published the statutes. Bishop Henri le Barbu (1404–1419) remarked after Pentecost 1406 that he had held more than one diocesan synod. On 24 October 1408, Bishop Henri's vicars held a synod. On the Thursday after Pentecost 1409, Bishop Henri himself presided over a synod.

A provincial council was held in Nantes on 23 April 1431, by Archbishop Philippe de Coëtquis of Tours. In 1445, Bishop Guillaume de Malestroit (1443–1461) presided over a diocesan synod, and over another in 1446, in both cases issuing statutes. Bishop Pierre du Chaffault (1477–1487) held a diocesan synod on the Thursday after Pentecost, 14 May 1478, and issued statutes. He held another on the Thursday after Pentecost, 10 June 1481. A synod was held on 23 May 1499 by the Vicars-General of Bishop Jean d'Espinay (1495–1500). Bishop François Hamon (1511–1532) held a diocesan synod in 1529. Bishop Antoine de Créquy (1554–1562) held synods in 1555, 1556, 1558, and 1560.

Bishop Gabriel de Beauvau (1636–1667) held a diocesan synod in 1638. He held another on 12 June 1642, and published the statutes of the diocese. Another synod was held on 24 May 1646, under the authority of Bishop de Beauvau, by his vicar-general; it issued five statutes, including arrangements for financing a new seminary.

=== University of Nantes ===
Despite the fact that a university already existed at Angers, 89 km. (56 mi.) to the east, John V, Duke of Brittany, had conceived a plan to create a university in Nantes, which he communicated to Pope John XXIII. The pope responded on 1 August 1414, not with a university charter, but with a grant of one-third of all the ecclesiastical revenues within the duchy for a period of one year. These were to fund the payment of salaries to teachers. Nothing seems to have come of this effort, but a bull, which has not survived, was signed by Pope Martin V (1417–1431). It too seems to have come to nothing. Duke John V died in 1442 and was succeeded by his son Francis I.

Pope Nicholas V issued another charter in 1449, in which he mentioned Martin V's charter; but this bull too had no effect, since Francis I died suddenly in 1450, leaving the ducal throne to his brother, Peter II, who died in 1457. Francis II, a nephew of John V, was able finally to realize the family project. On 4 April 1460, Pope Pius II issued another charter, and the next year a university was actually opened. The bishop of Nantes was to be the chancellor of the University. There were faculties of the Arts, Medicine, theology, Canon and Civil Law. The prosperity of the university did not long outlast the death of its patron in 1488. It was revived as a school of law in 1494, though that was transferred to Rennes in 1735. All institutions of higher learning became the property of the French state in 1791.

=== Seminary ===
After his synod of 12 June 1642, bishop Gabriel de Beauvau announced the establishment of a seminary for the diocese. Previous to this, candidates for the priesthood studied at home or in parish rectories, and were required to partake in a retreat of several days, conducted by the Oratorian fathers. In 1790, the establishment had 9 chambers for teachers, 76 dormitory rooms, with beds for 86 students.

=== Irish seminary ===
A college was created at Nantes c. 1680, with the permission of Bishop Jean-François de Beauvau du Rivau (1677–1717), for the education of Irish ecclesiastics. In 1765, King Louis XV granted the college letters patent officially recognizing the college, which, he notes, took root with a large immigration of Irish clerics in 1685. The college was under the jurisdiction of the University of Nantes.

=== Events at Nantes ===
The philosopher Peter Abelard was born in 1079 at La Pallet, 8 miles east of Nantes. The First Crusade was preached at Nantes in 1099 by Robert of Arbrissel, founder of the monastery of Fontevrault. The Abbey of La Meilleraye, founded in 1132, was the beginning of an establishment of Trappist Fathers, who played a part in the agricultural development of the country. Charles of Blois won Nantes from his rival Jean de Montfort in 1341. On 8 January 1499, Louis XII married Anne of Brittany at Nantes in the chapel of the château.

Chateaubriant, a town of the diocese, was a Calvinist centre in the 16th century. The Edict of Nantes (1595), which granted Protestants religious freedom and certain political prerogatives, was published at Nantes by order of King Henri IV.

The Maréchal de Thémines, governor of Brittany, died on 1 November 1627; his funeral was held in Nantes, though his remains were taken to his home town, Cahors, for burial. He was succeeded as governor of Brittany and Nantes by the Cardinal de Richelieu. Richelieu was made governor of the citadel of Nantes on 1 March 1632.

On 30 March 1654, Cardinal de Retz, who was struggling to maintain his right to the archbishopric of Paris against the opposition of the French court because he had been a leading Frondeur, was transferred from his imprisonment in the Chateau de Vincennes, and lodged in the castle of Nantes by order of Cardinal Mazarin and Louis XIV. He contrived to escape on 8 August 1654.

=== French Revolution ===
Even before it directed its attention to the Church directly, the National Constituent Assembly attacked the institution of monasticism. On 13 February 1790. it issued a decree which stated that the government would no longer recognize solemn religious vows taken by either men or women. In consequence, Orders and Congregations which lived under a Rule were suppressed in France. Members of either sex were free to leave their monasteries or convents if they wished, and could claim an appropriate pension by applying to the local municipal authority.

The Assembly ordered the replacement of political subdivisions of the ancien régime with subdivisions called "departments", to be characterized by a single administrative city in the center of a compact area. The decree was passed on 22 December 1789, the boundaries fixed on 26 February 1790, with the institution to be effective on 4 March 1790. A new department was created called "Loire-Inférieure," and Nantes was fixed as its administrative center. The National Constituent Assembly then, on 6 February 1790, instructed its ecclesiastical committee to prepare a plan for the reorganization of the clergy. At the end of May, its work was presented as a draft Civil Constitution of the Clergy, which, after vigorous debate, was approved on 12 July 1790. There was to be one diocese in each department, requiring the suppression of approximately fifty dioceses. The diocese of Loire-Infrieure was assigned to the "Metropole du Nord-Ouest", with its metropolitan seated in Rennes.

In the Civil Constitution of the Clergy, the National Constituent Assembly also abolished cathedral chapters, canonicates, prebends, chapters and dignities of collegiate churches, chapters of both secular and regular clergy of both sexes, and abbeys and priories whether existing under a Rule or in commendam.

There was considerable resistance to implementing these changes, and therefore the government required an oath to the Civil Constitution and an oath to the Constitution of Year III from every cleric. Those who took the oaths were permitted to serve in the "Constitutional Church"; non-juring clergy were expelled and arrested. In the diocese of Nantes there was massive resistance: of the 600 clergy, only 153 took the oath. Bishop de la Laurencie published a protest against the abolition of the cathedral Chapter and the collegiate churches; he also published his opposition to the oaths, his own dismissal, and the intrusion of a Constitutional bishop, Julien Minée. He was forced to emigrate, settling in England, from which he governed his diocese through his vicars-general. Minée resigned during the Terror in November 1793, apostasized, and married; he died in 1808.

During the French Revolution, certain regions of the diocese were the scene of the War of La Vendée, waged in defence of religious freedom and to restore the monarchy. At Savenay in December, 1793, the remains of the Vendean army succumbed, already defeated in the battle of Cholet. The atrocities committed at Nantes by the Terrorist Carrier are well-known. He conducted a reign of terror, called the Drownings at Nantes, between November 1793 and February 1794, which resulted in the deaths of more than 4,000 persons, many of them priests and nuns.

=== Religious orders and congregations ===
The Dominicans were established in Nantes in 1226, thanks to the patronage of André, Seigneur de Vitry. The Franciscan convent was founded in 1296, though they had a presence since the middle of the century. The Carmelites were introduced in 1318. The Carthusians were established in 1425. The Capuchins appeared in 1593, and occupied their convent at La Fosse in 1629. The Minims (Bonshommes) came in 1589, patronized by Duke François II. The Oratorians were established in Nantes in 1618.The Sulpicians took charge of the diocesan seminary in 1648. The Jesuits arrived in 1663; the Brothers of the Christian Schools (Christian Brothers, Frères des écoles chrétiennes) in 1743.

The Ursulines, founded by Saint Angela Merici, were established at Nantes in 1627. Elsewhere in the diocese, Ancensis was founded in 1642, Chateaubriant in 1643, and Guérande in 1644. After their dispersal during the French Revolution, the return of the Ursuliness to Nantes was authorized in 1826.

The Soeurs de la Providence, a diocesan congregation, were founded at Nantes in 1758, but dispersed by the French Revolution; they returned in 1810.

Among the congregations for women in the diocese are: the Sisters of Christian Instruction, a teaching order founded in 1820 at Beignon (Diocese of Vannes) by Abbé Deshayes; their mother-house was transferred to St-Gildas des Bois (diocese of Nantes) in 1828.

The Sisters of the Immaculate Conception, a teaching and nursing order, were founded in 1853 (mother-house at La Haye Mahéas). The Franciscan Sisters were founded in 1871 (mother-house at St-Philbert de Grandlieu). The Oblate Franciscan Sisters of the Heart of Jesus were founded in 1875 and brought to Nantes in 1877 by Sophie Victorine de Gazeau (mother-house at Nantes).

=== Saints in the diocese ===
The diocese venerates: the monk Saint Hervé (6th century); the hermits Saint Friard and Saint Secondel of Besné (6th century); Saint Victor, hermit at Cambon (6th or 7th century); the English hermit Saint Viaud (7th or 8th century); the Greek Benoît, Abbot of Masserac (c. 845); Saint Martin of Vertou (d. 601), apostle of the Herbauges district and founder of the Benedictine Vertou Abbey; Saint Hermeland, sent by Lambert, Abbot of Fontenelle, at the end of the 7th century to found on an island in the Loire the great monastery of Aindre (now Indret); the celebrated missionary Saint Amand, Bishop of Maastricht (7th century), a native of the district of Herbauges.

==== Pilgrimages ====
The chief places of pilgrimage of the diocese are: Notre-Dame de Bon Garant at Orvault, a very old pilgrimage, repeatedly made by Francis II, Duke of Brittany; Notre-Dame de Bon Secours at Nantes, a pilgrimage centre which dates back to the 14th century; Notre-Dame de Toutes Aides. Notre-Dame de Miséricorde became a place of pilgrimage in 1026 in memory of the miracle by which the country is said to have been freed from a dragon; the present seat of the pilgrimage is the Church of St. Similien at Nantes.

== Bishops ==
Before 453, the list of bishops is undocumented.

=== To 1000 ===
- [ Clarus ]
- c. 310–330: Ennius
- c. 330 : Similien
- c. 374 : Eumalius or Euhemerus.
- c. 383: Martius
- End of 4th century: Arisius
- 453 : Desiderius
- Leo
- attested 461 : Eusebius
- c. 462 – c. 472: Nonnechius
- Cariundus, † c. 475
- Cerunius
- Clemens, † c. 502
- 511: Epiphanius
- c. 515 – 541: Eumerius
- 549–582: Felix of Nantes.
- Nonnechius (II.), † 596.
- 610–614: Eufronius
- c. 626–627: Leobardus
- c. 630: Pascharius
- c. 637: Taurinus
- c. 640: Haïco
- c. 650: Sallapius
- [ c. 703: Agatheus ]
- [ Anito ]
- [ c. 725: Émilien of Nantes ]
- 732: Salvius
- 756–757: Deormarus
- c. 776 – † c. 800: Odilard
- c. 800: Alain
- c. 820 – † 833: Atton
- 834 – † 835: Drutcaire
- 835–824. June 843: Gunthard
- 843–846: Actard
- 851: Gislard
- 853–871: Actard (restored)
- 872–886: Ermengar
- 886 – 896: Landranus
- 896 – 906: Foucher
- 906 – 908 : Isaias
- 907 : Adalard
- 937–949 : Hoctron
- 950–958 : Herdren
- c. 960 – † c. 980 : Gauthier

(981 –987) : Sede vacante
[ 981 : Werecus ]

- [ 987: Judicaël ] Administrator
- 990–992 : Hugo
- 992 – † 1005 : Hervé

=== 1000 to 1300 ===
- 1005 – after 15 October 1041 : Gualterius
- c. 1047 – 1049 : Budic
- 1049–1052: Airard
- 1052 – 1079: Quiriac
- 1079–1111: Benedict
- 1112: Robert
- 1112 – 1140: Brice
- 1142 – 1147 : Iterius
- 1147 – † 29 December 1169 : Bernard
- 1170 – 1184 : Robert.
- 1184 – † 1187 : Artur?
- 1185–1198 : Maurice de Blaron
- 1199 – 1212 : Geoffroi
- 1213 – 1227 : Etienne de la Bruyère
- 1227: Clément II.
- 1228 – 1235 : Henri
- 1236 – 1240 : Robert of Nantes
- 1240 – 1263 : Galeran
- 1264 : Gautier
- 1264 – 1267 : Jacques
- 1267 – 1277 : Guillaume de Verne
- 1278 – 1292 : Durand
- 1292 – 1297: Henri de Calestrie
- 1298 – 1304: Henri
- 1304 – 1337: Daniel Viger
- 1338 – 1340 : Barnabé
- 1340 – 1354 : Olivier Salahadin
- 1354 – 1366 : Robert Paynel
- 16 March 1366 – 1384: Simon de Langres
- 1384 – 1391: Jean de Montrelais (Avignon Obedience)
- 1392 – 1398 : Bonabius de Rochefort (Avignon Obedience)
- 1397 – 1404 : Bernard du Peyron
- 1404 – 1419 : Henri le Barbu, Avignon Obedience)
- 1419 – 1443 : Jean de Malestroit
- 1443 – 1461 : Guillaume de Malestroit
- 1462 – 1477 : Amauri d'Acigné

[ 1477: Jacques d'Elbiest ]

- 1477 – 1487 : Pierre du Chaffault
- 1488 – 1493 : Robert d'Espinay
- 1493 – 1500 : Jean d'Espinay

=== 1500–1800 ===
- 1500–1506: Guillaume Guégen
- 1507–1511: Robert Guibé
- 1511–1532: François Hamon
- 1532–1542: Louis d'Acigné
- 1542–1550 : John, Cardinal of Lorraine
- 1550–1554 : Charles, Cardinal de Bourbon
- 1554–1562 : Antoine de Créquy
- 1562–1566 : Antoine II de Créquy
- 1566–1594 : Philippe du Bec

[ 1596 : Jean du Bec-Crespin ]

- 1598–1617 : Charles de Bourgneuf de Cucé

[ Henri de Bourgneuf d'Orgères ]

1617–1621 : Sede vacante

- 1621–1636 : Philippe Cospéau
- 1636–1667 : Gabriel de Beauvau
- 1668–1677 : Gilles de La Baume Le Blanc de La Vallière
- 1677–1717 : Jean-François de Beauvau du Rivau
- 1717–1723 : Louis de La Vergne-Montenard de Tressan
- 1723–1746 : Christophe-Louis Turpin de Crissé de Sanzay
- 1746–1775 : Pierre Mauclerc de La Mousanchère
- 1775–1783 : Jean-Augustin Frétat de Sarra
- 1784–1801 : Charles-Eutrope de La Laurencie

Constitutional Bishop of Loire-Inférieur

- 1791–1793 : Julien Minée

=== From 1800 ===
- 1802–1813: Jean-Baptiste Duvoisin
- 1817–1822: Louis-Jules-François-Joseph d'Andigné de Mayneuf
- 1822–1838: Joseph-Michel-Jean-Baptiste-Paul-Augustin Micolon de Guérines
- 1838–1848: Jean-François de Hercé
- 1848–1869: Antoine-Matthias-Alexandre Jacquemet
- 1870–1877: Félix Fournier
- 1877–1892: Jules François Lecoq
- 1893–1895: Auguste-Léopold Laroche
- 1896–1914: Pierre-Emile Rouard
- 1914–1935: Eugène-Louis-Marie Le Fer de la Motte
- 1936–1966: Jean-Joseph-Léonce Villepelet
- 1966–1982: Michel-Louis Vial
- 1982–1996: Émile Marcus, P.S.S.
- 1996–2009: Georges Soubrier, P.S.S.
- 2009–2019: Jean-Paul James
- 2020–present: Laurent Percerou

== See also ==
- Catholic Church in France
- Basilica of St. Nicolas, Nantes
- Church of St Clement, Nantes

== Bibliography ==
=== Reference works ===
- Eubel, Conradus, ed. (1913). Hierarchia catholica (in Latin). Vol. 1 (second ed.). Münster: Libreria Regensbergiana.
- Eubel, Conradus, ed. (1914). Hierarchia catholica (in Latin). Vol. 2 (second ed.). Münster: Libreria Regensbergiana.
- Gulik, Guilelmus (1923). Eubel, Conradus (ed.). Hierarchia catholica (in Latin). Vol. 3 (second ed.). Münster: Libreria Regensbergiana.
- Gauchat, Patritius (Patrice) (1935). Hierarchia catholica (in Latin). Vol. 4 (1592-1667). Münster: Libraria Regensbergiana.
- Ritzler, Remigius; Sefrin, Pirminus (1952). Hierarchia catholica medii et recentis aevi (in Latin). Vol. 5 (1667-1730). Patavii: Messagero di S. Antonio.
- Ritzler, Remigius; Sefrin, Pirminus (1958). Hierarchia catholica medii et recentis aevi (in Latin). Vol. 6 (Tomus VI) (1730–1799). Patavii: Messagero di S. Antonio.
- Ritzler, Remigius; Sefrin, Pirminus (1968). Hierarchia Catholica medii et recentioris aevi (in Latin). Vol. VII (1800–1846). Monasterii: Libreria Regensburgiana.
- Remigius Ritzler; Pirminus Sefrin (1978). Hierarchia catholica Medii et recentioris aevi (in Latin). Vol. VIII (1846–1903). Il Messaggero di S. Antonio.
- Pięta, Zenon (2002). Hierarchia catholica medii et recentioris aevi (in Latin). Vol. IX (1903–1922). Padua: Messagero di San Antonio. ISBN 978-88-250-1000-8.

=== Studies ===
- Besse, J.-M. (1920). "Diocese de Nantes," in: Dom Beaunier (ed.), Abbayes et prieures de l'ancienne France: recueil historique des archevêchés, évêchés, abbayes et prieurés de France, (in French), Volume 8 (Paris: A. Picard, 1920), pp. 235-265.
- De la Borderie, Arthur Lemoyne (1888). Études historiques bretonnes. (in French) iie sèrie, Volume 2. Paris: H. Champion 1888. [Saint Clair, and Saint Yves]
- Duchesne, Louis Fastes épiscopaux de l'ancienne Gaule: Vol. II: L'Aquitaine et les Lyonnaises. (in French). deuxième edition. Paris: Thorin & fils, 1910. pp. 360–371. Internet Archive
- Durand, Yves; Faugeras, Marius; Tonnerre, Noël-Yves; et al. (1985). Le Diocèse de Nantes. (in French). Paris: Editions Beauchesne, 1985.
- Durville, Georges (1913). Les fouilles de l'évêché de Nantes, 1910-1913. (in French). Nantes: Dugas, 1913.
- Grégoire, Pierre Marie (1882). État du Diocèse de Nantes en 1790. (in French). Nantes: V. Forest et E. Grimaud, 1882.
- Grégoire, Pierre Marie (1885). Le rétablissement du culte dans le diocèse de Nantes après la révolution. Nantes: Forest/Grimaud, 1885.
- Hauréau, Barthélemy (1856). Gallia Christiana: In Provincias Ecclesiasticas Distributa... De provincia Turonensi (in Latin). Vol. 14. Paris: Typographia Regia. pp. 793–830, "Instrumenta" pp. 171–188..
- Kerviler, René (1907), "Nantes", (in French), in: L'épiscopat français depuis le Concordat jusqu'à la Séparation (1802-1905), (Paris: Société bibliographique (France) Librairie des Saints-Pères, 1907), pp. 396-403.
- Lallié, Alfred (1893). Le diocèse de Nantes pendant la Révolution (in French). Volume 1. Nantes: B. Cier, 1893. Volume 2.
- Merlet, René (1896). La Chronique de Nantes: (570 - 1049). (in Latin and French). Paris: A. Picard et Fils, 1896.
- Travers, Nicolas (1836). Histoire civile, politique et religieuse de la ville et du comté de Nantes. (in French). Volume 1. Nantes: Forest, 1836. Vol. 2 (1837). Volume 3 (1841).

=== External links ===
- (in French) Centre national des Archives de l'Église de France, L’Épiscopat francais depuis 1919, retrieved: 2016-12-24.
- Goyau, Georges. "Nantes (Nannetes)." The Catholic Encyclopedia. Vol. 10. New York: Robert Appleton Company, 1911. Accessed 15 November 2024.
