= Gohard =

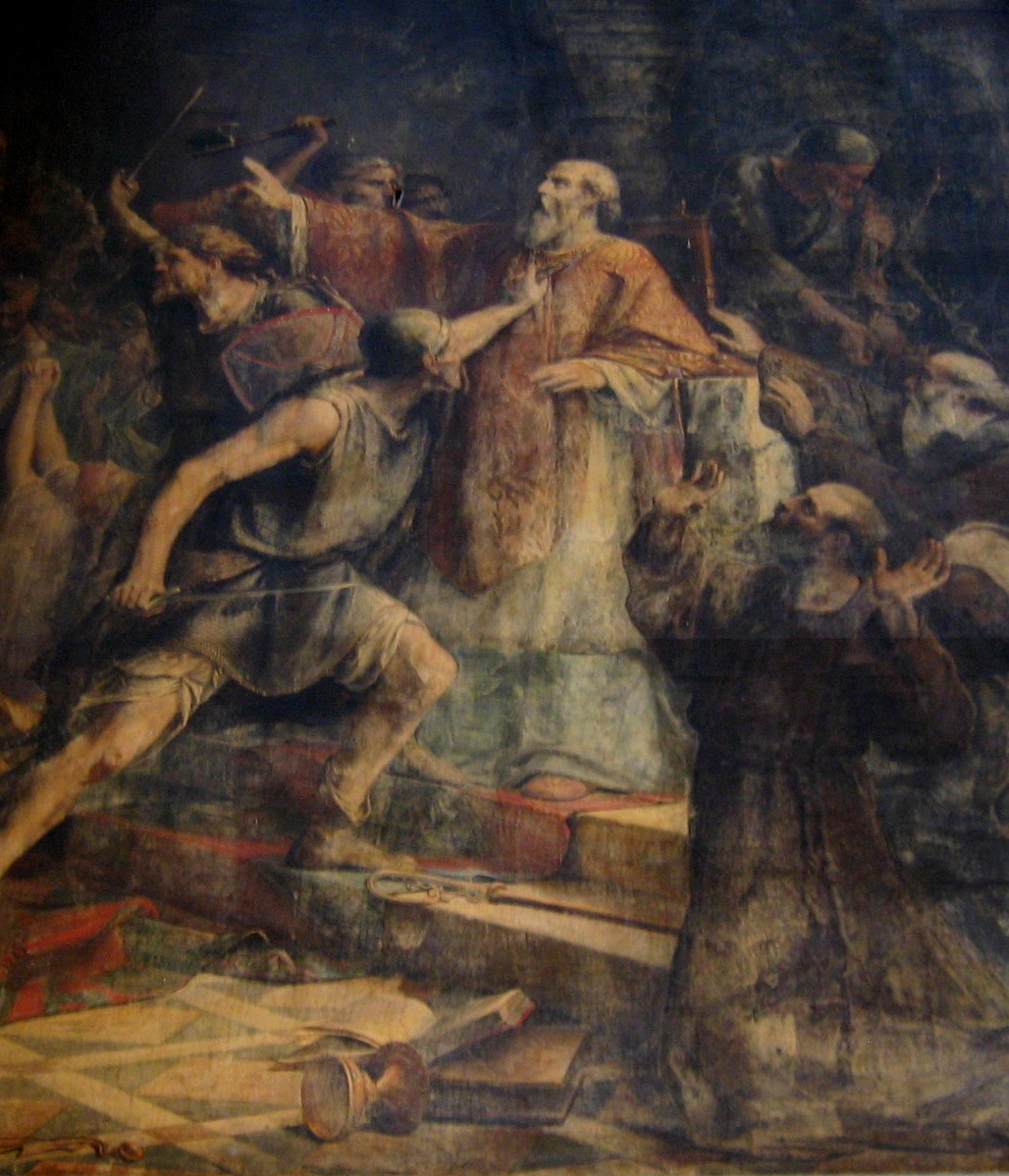
St. Gohard and the Vikings

Gohard or Gunhard was a 9th-century bishop of Nantes, lord of Blain, saint and cephalophore martyr of the Roman Catholic Church.

Gohard was born in Angers. It was during his episcopate that the Battle of Blain took place in 843 AD, the first major battle between the Franks and the Britons. Damage caused by struggles between these two factions in the area was compounded by Viking raids.

On the feast day of St. John the Baptist, a month after the defeat of Blain, the Vikings arrived at Nantes. Gohard was celebrating Mass in Nantes Cathedral before a large audience when the Vikings attacked, killing the priest and his congregation. Legend says that Gohard picked up his severed head and walked down to the Loire where a boat took him to Angers. His body was buried in St. Peter's Collegiate Church in Angers, the city where he was born.

Gohard was canonized in 1096. The Romanesque crypt of Nantes Cathedral is dedicated to him, and was redesigned shortly after his canonization to house relics brought from Angers. A side chapel of the cathedral is also dedicated to him.

His feast day is celebrated on 24 June.

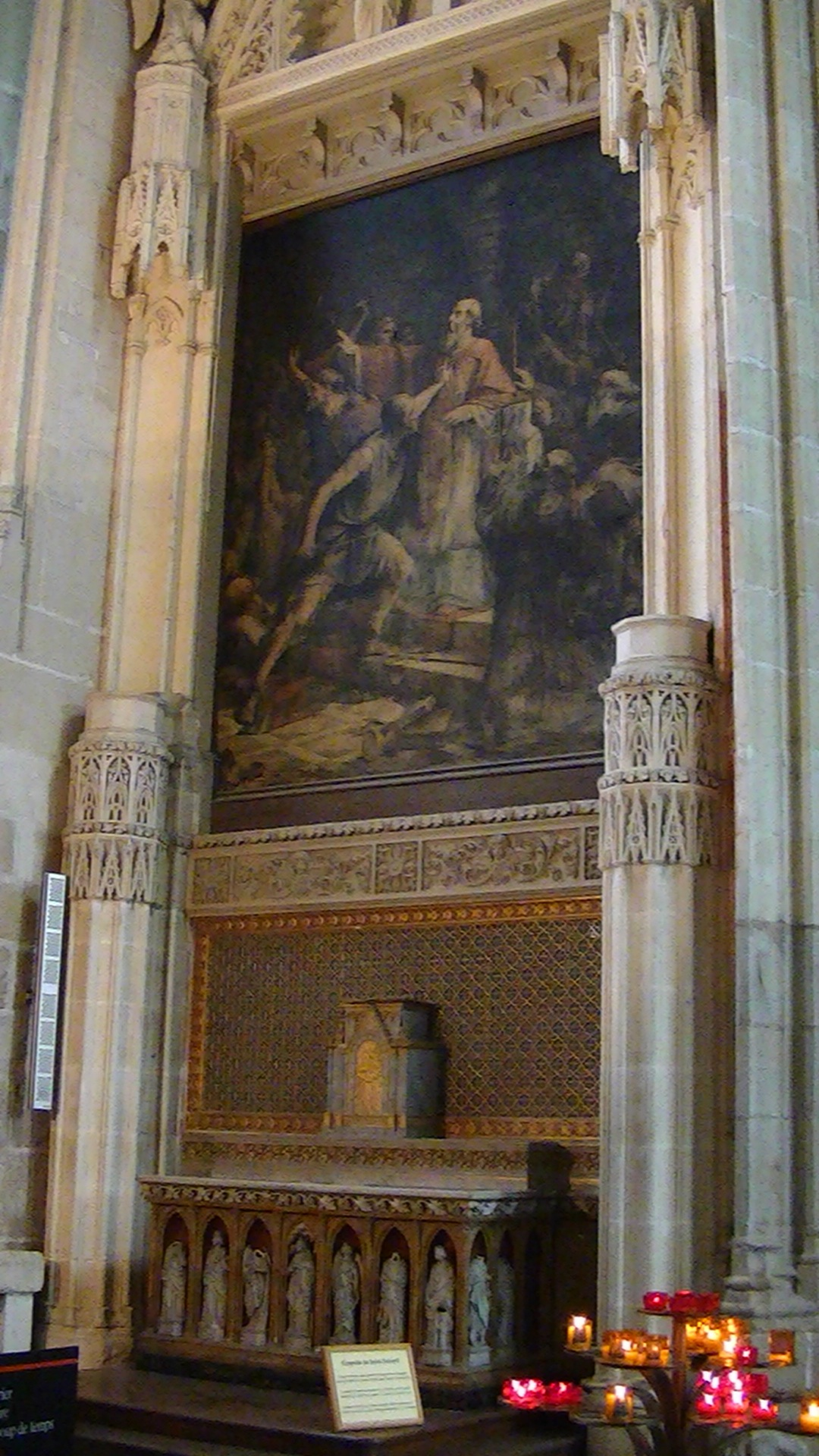
Chapel of St. Gohard in Nantes Cathedral

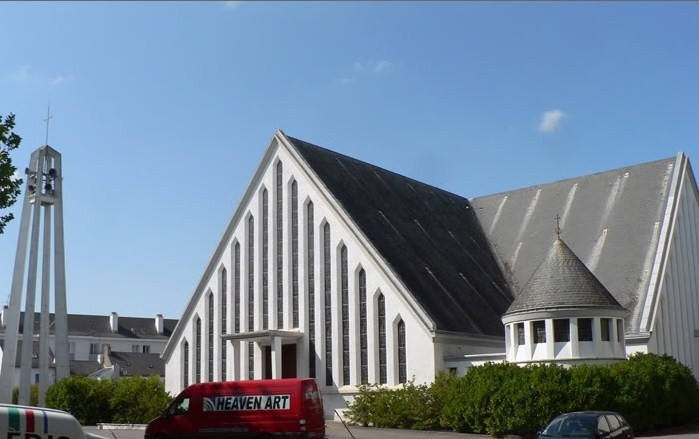
Church of St. Gohard

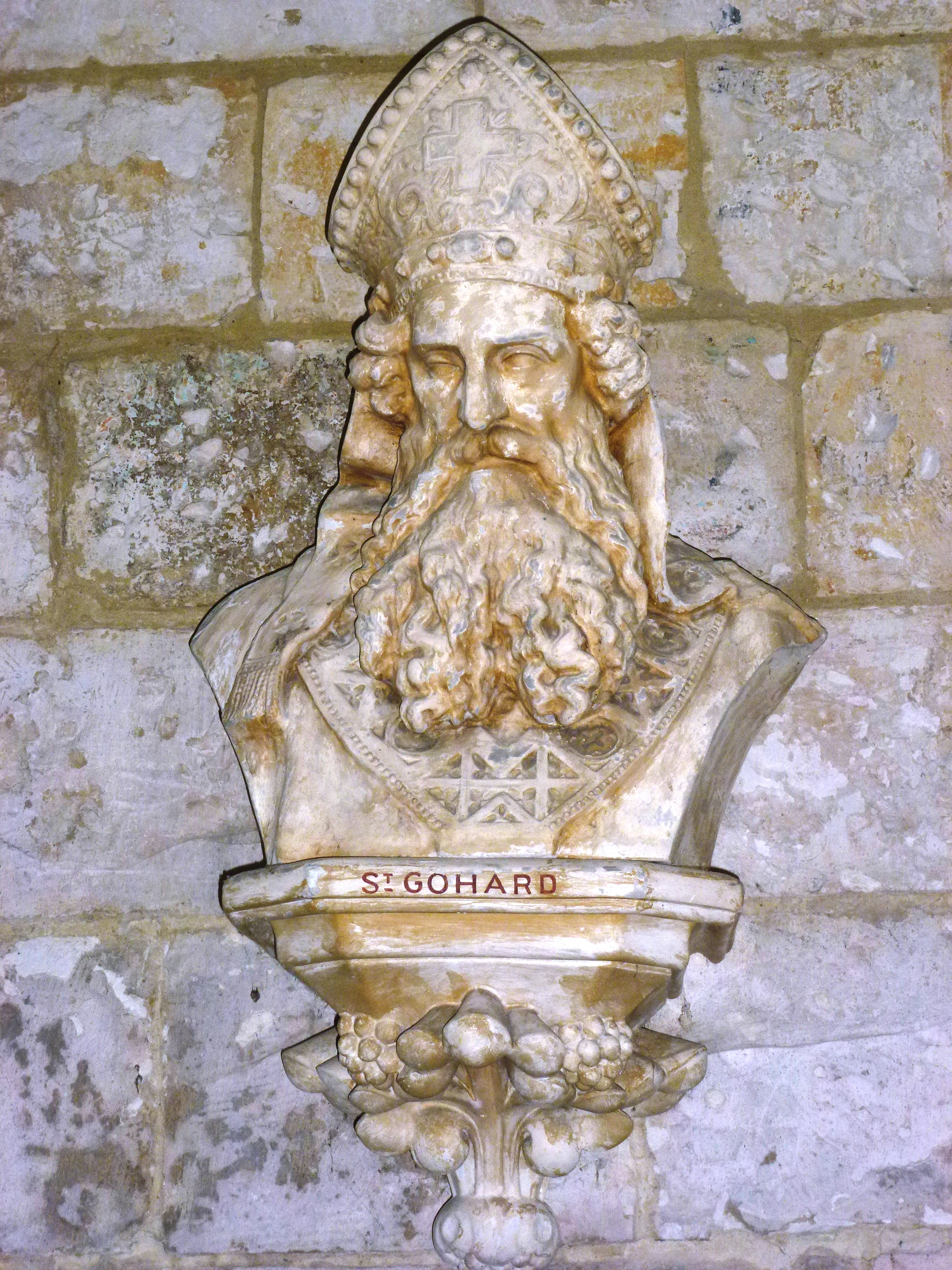
St. Gohard in the church of St. Nicholas

== See also ==
- Gotthard of Hildesheim
