= Colaenus =

Early ruler of Attica

In Greek mythology, Colaenus (Ancient Greek: Κόλαινος, romanized: Kólainos) was an early ruler of Attica who reigned before Cecrops became the first king of Athens, according to the inhabitants of the Attic deme of Myrrhinus.

== Family ==
Colaenus was said to be a descendant of Hermes.

== Mythology ==
In obedience to an oracle, Colaenus established the worship of Artemis under the local epithet Artemis Colaenis (named after him) at a sanctuary in Myrrhinus.

He may be the same Colaenus who led a group of settlers from Athens to migrate to Messenia in the Peloponnese. According to local legend, an oracle instructed him to follow a crested lark (korydos) to find the site for his new settlement. The bird guided him to a coastal hill where he founded the town of Colonides, whose residents maintained they were of Athenian rather than Messenian descent.
