= Clarus (disambiguation) =

Clarus may refer to:

- A common Ancient Roman cognomen
- Claros or Klaros, a cult center in ancient Greece
- Giulio Claro (1525–1575), an Italian jurist
- Clarus the dogcow, an Apple Computer icon
- Saint Clarus, an English missionary martyred in about 894 at Livery Dole near the River Epte, Normandy
- Clair of Nantes, or Clarus, a 3rd century bishop of Nantes, France
