= Thouria, Messenia =

Thouria Θουρία
- Municipal unit
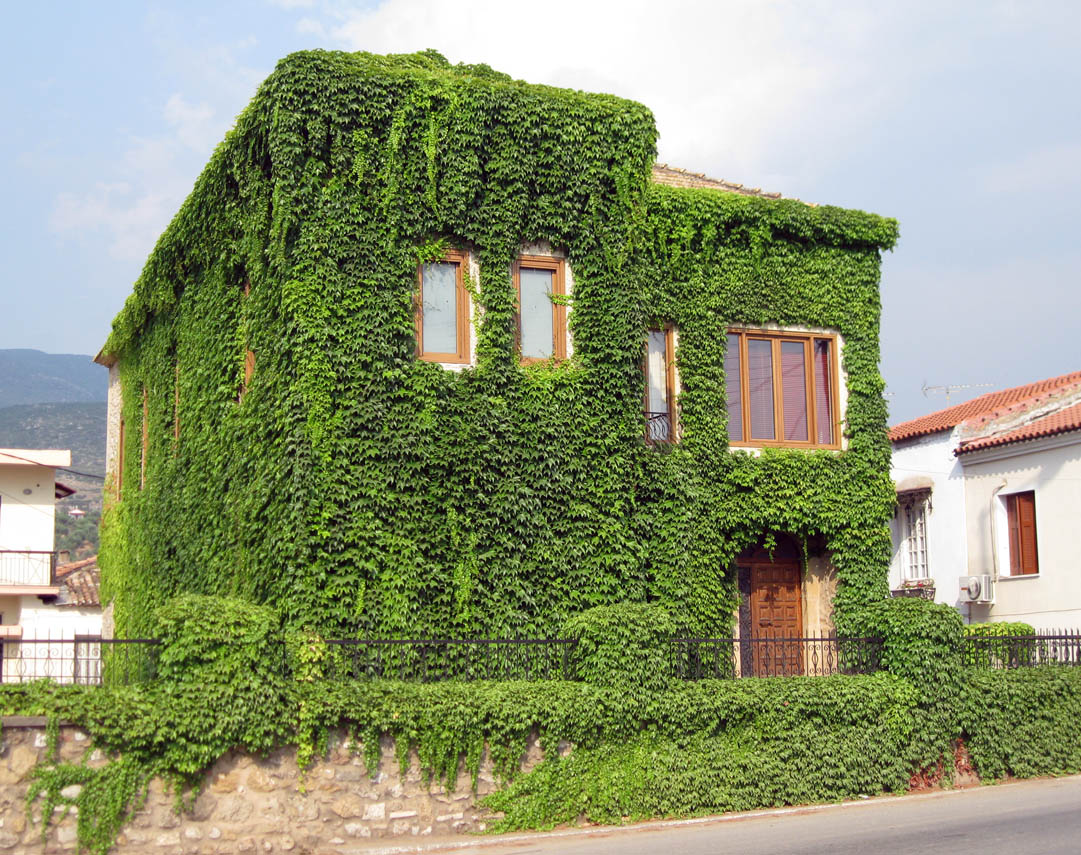
- Stone house covered with Boston ivy in Thouria

- Location within the regional unit

- Location within Greece
- Coordinates: 37°05′N 22°03′E
- Country: Greece
- Administrative region: Peloponnese
- Regional unit: Messenia
- Municipality: Kalamata

Area
  - Municipal unit: 76.922 km^{2} (29.700 sq mi)

Population (2021)
  - Municipal unit: 2,688
  - Municipal unit density: 34.94/km^{2} (90.51/sq mi)
  - Community: 926
- Time zone: UTC+2 (EET)
  - Summer (DST): UTC+3 (EEST)
- Vehicle registration: ΚΜ

Thouria (Greek: Θουρία) is a village and a former municipality in Messenia, Peloponnese, Greece. Since the 2011 local government reform it is part of the municipality Kalamata, of which it is a municipal unit. The municipal unit has an area of 76.922 km^{2}. Its population in 2021 was 2,688. It takes its name from the ancient town of Thuria.

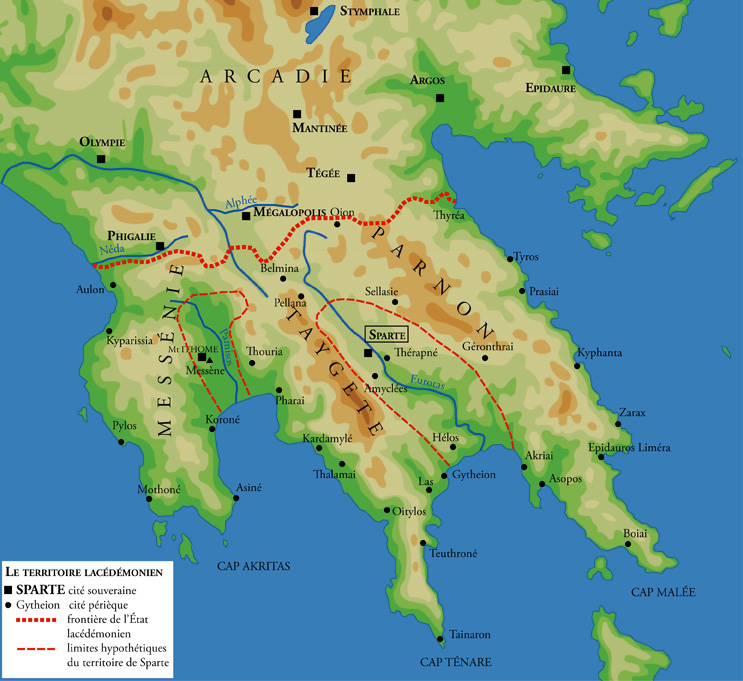
Thouria in ancient Greece, located west of Sparta.
