= Jules François Lecoq =

French priest

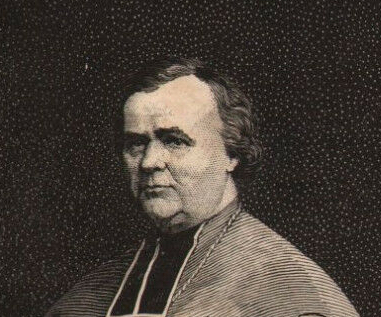
portrait of Jules François Lecoq

Jules François Lecoq (born 8 October 1821 in Vire) was a French clergyman and bishop for the Roman Catholic Diocese of Luçon and for Roman Catholic Diocese of Nantes. He became ordained in 1845. He was appointed bishop in 1875. He died in 1892.
