= Amauri d'Acigné =

15th-century Catholic bishop

Most Reverend Amauri d'Acigné
- Bishop of Nantes
- Church: Catholic Church
- Diocese: Diocese of Nantes
- In office: 1462–1477
- Predecessor: Guillaume de Malestroit
- Successor: Pierre du Chaffault

Orders
- Consecration: 11 April 1462 by Guillaume d'Estouteville

Personal details
- Died: 23 February 1477 Nantes, France

Amauri d'Acigné (died 1477) was a Roman Catholic prelate who served as Bishop of Nantes (1462–1477).

== Biography ==
On 29 March 1462, Amauri d'Acigné was appointed during the papacy of Pope Pius II as Bishop of Nantes. On 11 April 1462, he was consecrated bishop by Guillaume d'Estouteville, Cardinal-Bishop of Ostia e Velletri, with Jean de Beauvau, Bishop of Angers, and Isnard de Grasse, Bishop of Grasse, serving as co-consecrators. He served as Bishop of Nantes until his death on 23 February 1477.

Catholic Church titles
Preceded by Guillaume de Malestroit	Bishop of Nantes; 1462–1477	Succeeded by Pierre du Chaffault
