= Robert II, Bishop of Nantes =

Bishop of Nantes from 1170 to 1184

Robert II was the Bishop of Nantes from 1170 to 1184.

== Biography ==
Before his election, Robert was the archdeacon of Nantes. When his uncle, bishop Bernard of Escoublac, died in 1180, Robert was appointed bishop by Henry II of England, who was at the time count of Nantes and overlord of the Duchy of Brittany. Robert was one of Henry's most trusted advisors in Brittany, Normandy, and England. He was also a member of the council of three bishops who were responsible for enforcing the treaty concluded between Henry II and Louis VII of France in 1177.

Robert went on pilgrimage to Jerusalem in 1184 and died in Brindisi on his return home.

== Sources ==
- Judith Everard, Brittany and the Angevins: Province and Empire 1158-1203 (Cambridge University Press, 2000).
- Robert de Torigny, Chronicle of the Reigns of Stephen, Henry II, and Richard I (London, 1889).

Preceded by Bernard I	Bishop of Nantes; 1170-1184	Succeeded by Arthur
