= Martin of Vertou =

6th-century abbot and hermit

Arms of Vertou bearing Saint Martin's yew tree

Martin of Vertou (527–601) was a hermit and abbot, founder of Vertou Abbey, and the evangelist of the region around Nantes in Francia. He is sometimes known as the Apostle of the Herbauges, and he is sometimes called Mark of Vertou.

== Life ==
Martin was distinguished by his virtue, learning, and talent. He was ordained by Felix, Bishop of Nantes, who also made him archdeacon of the church of Nantes and charged him with converting the inhabitants of the town and the surrounding area to Christianity.

In about 577, he withdrew into solitude in an area of wasteland on the right bank of the Sèvre Nantaise. Gradually, as people were drawn to him by his sanctity, he built a church and enlarged his hermitage, which became Vertou Abbey. He also founded other religious communities, including Durieu Abbey, where he died in 601 at the age of seventy-four.

There is a legend that he planted his pilgrim's staff in the middle of the abbey courtyard at Vertou and that it took root, growing into a yew tree, which appears on the arms of the commune of Vertou.

His feast day is 24 October.

== Sources ==
- Catholic.org (Saints and Angels): Martin of Vertou
- SPQN Patron Saints Index: Martin of Vertou
