= Aipeia =

Aipeia Αίπεια
- Municipal unit
- Location within the regional unit

- Location within Greece
- Coordinates: 36°51′N 21°54′E
- Country: Greece
- Administrative region: Peloponnese
- Regional unit: Messenia
- Municipality: Messini

Area
  - Municipal unit: 55.572 km^{2} (21.456 sq mi)

Population (2021)
  - Municipal unit: 1,319
  - Municipal unit density: 23.73/km^{2} (61.47/sq mi)
- Time zone: UTC+2 (EET)
  - Summer (DST): UTC+3 (EEST)
- Vehicle registration: ΚΜ

Aipeia (Greek: Αίπεια) is a former municipality in Messenia, Peloponnese, Greece. Since the 2011 local government reform it is part of the municipality Messini, of which it is a municipal unit. The municipal unit has an area of 55.572 km^{2}. Population 1,319 (2021). The seat of the municipality was in Longa. Modern Aipeia is named after Aepeia, a town on the Messenian Gulf mentioned in Homer's Iliad as Αἴπεια.
