= Epimelides =

Group of nymphs in Greek mythology

In Greek mythology, Epimelides (Ancient Greek: Ἐπιμηλίδες) or Epimeliades (Ἐπιμηλιάδες) are nymphs who protect herds. Antoninus Liberalis relates a tale in which they compete with Messapian shepherds in dancing. The term may have sometimes also been used to refer to tree nymphs.

== Type of nymph ==
The Epimelides are nymphs who, it was believed, were tasked with protecting herds of animals. Pausanias (2nd century AD), who calls them "Epimeliades", mentions them as one of the three types of nymphs, alongside the Naiads and Dryads.

Other names – Mēlídes (Μηλίδες), Malídes (Μαλίδες), Maliádes (Μαλιάδες), and Hamamēlídes (Ἁμαμηλίδες) – denote nymphs associated with trees, and stem from the word mēléa (μηλέα); given these terms, Otto Jessen states that the term "Epimelides" may have at times also been used to refer to tree nymphs.

== Antoninus Liberalis ==
Antoninus Liberalis, citing Nicander (2nd century BC), relates that a group of performing Epimelides arrived in the land of the Messapians. Young local shepherds gathered to see them, leaving behind the animals under their protection, and proclaimed that their dancing abilities were superior to those of the nymphs. The Epimelides, incensed, competed in dancing against their mortal counterparts; but the men, unaware that they had challenged divinities, danced as though they were against other young men, and, being shepherds, their dancing was "without art". The nymphs, on the other hand, danced gracefully and beautifully, and beat their challengers, saying to them:

Young men, did you want to compete against Epimelid nymphs? So, you foolish fellows, now that you have been beaten, you will be punished.

The young men were then transformed into trees, and it is said that groans can still be heard emanating from these trees.

According to Jessen, this tale fits with both possible conceptions of these figures, as either nymphs related to herds or nymphs associated with trees. A similar tale appears in Ovid's Metamorphoses, in which a shephard from Apulia mocks the dancing of a group of nymphs, resulting in him being turned into a tree.
