= Felix of Nantes =

6th-century Bishop of Nantes, France

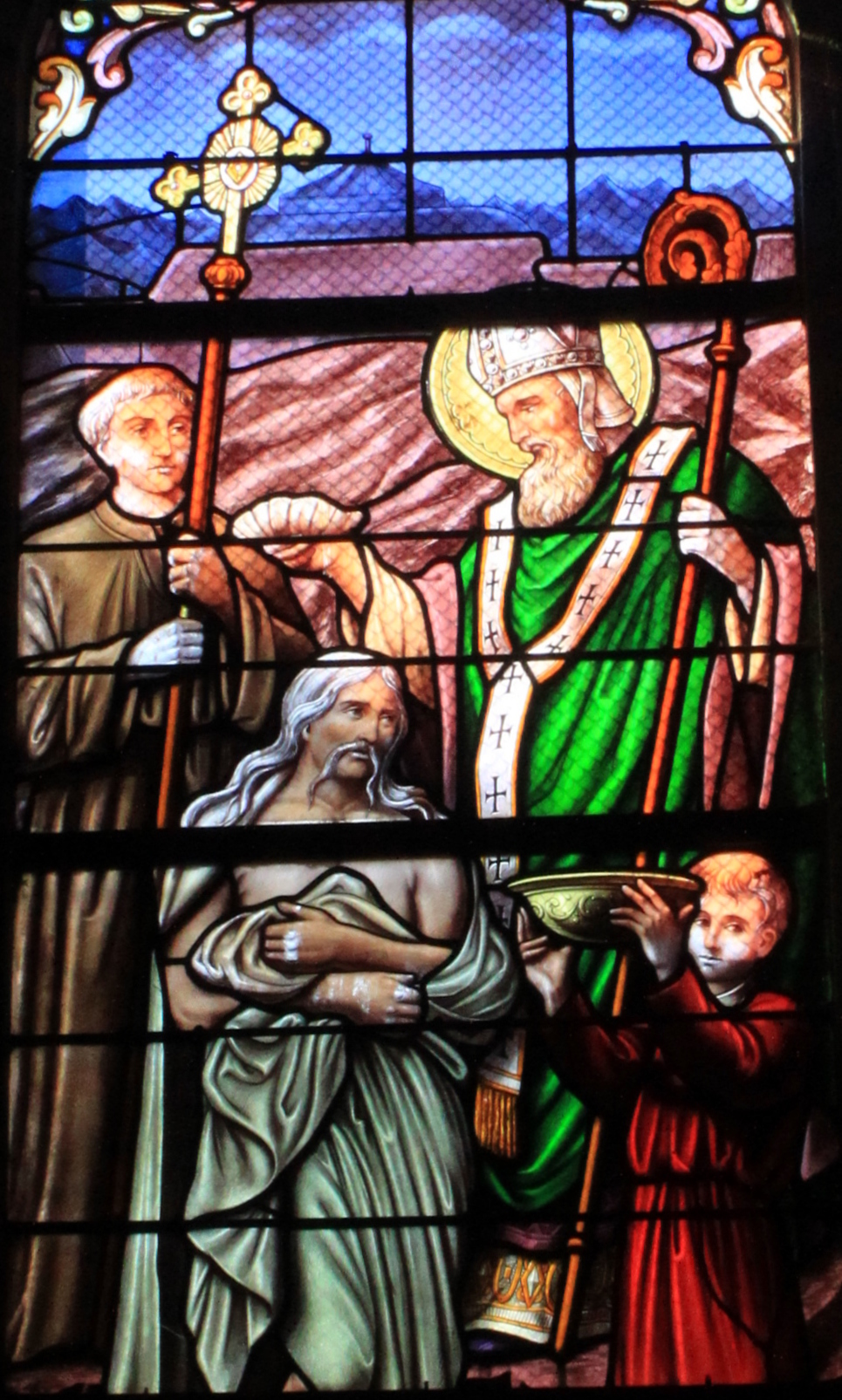
Félix of Nantes

Felix of Nantes (514-584) was a 6th-century Bishop of Nantes, France. He is venerated as a saint in the Catholic Church.

== Life ==
Felix was married, and in 551 at the age of 37, he was made Bishop of Nantes while his wife became a nun. He then sold his patrimony on behalf of the poor, and built a cathedral within city walls as planned by his predecessor, Evemer. His municipal improvements at Nantes were praised in the poems of Venantius Fortunatus.

He often mediated between the people of Brittany and Frankish kings. Guerech II, Count of Vannes, plundered the Diocese of Rennes and the Diocese of Vannes, and repulsed the troops which King Chilperic sent against him. At the entreaties of Bishop Felix, the count withdrew his forces and made peace.

Felix was at the Council of Paris in 557 and the Council of Tours in 567, where it was noted that some Gallo-Roman customs of ancestor worship were still being practiced.

He died at the age of 70 on January 8, 584, having served as Bishop of Nantes for 33 years. His feast day in the General Roman Calendar is on July 7.

== See also ==
- Martin of Vertou
