= Asine (Messenia) =

Town of ancient Messenia

Coordinates: 36°47′40″N 21°57′43″E

Asine (Ancient Greek: Ἀσίνη) was a town of ancient Messenia, which was built by the Dryopes, when they were expelled from Asine in the Argeia. In one of the early wars (740 BCE) between the Lacedaemonians and the Argives, the Asinaeans joined the former when they invaded the Argive territory under their king Nicander; but as soon as the Lacedaemonians returned home, the Argives laid siege to Asine and razed it to the ground, sparing only the temple of the Pythaëus Apollo. The Asinaeans escaped by sea; and the Lacedaemonians gave to them, after the end of the First Messenian War, a portion of the Messenian territory, where they built the Messenian Asine.

Asine stood on the western side of the Messenian Gulf, which was sometimes called the Asinaean gulf, from this town. Asine was distant 40 stadia north of the promontory Akritas, 40 stadia from Colonides, 15 miles from Methone, and 30 miles from Messene.

The Messenian Asine continued to be a place of considerable importance from its foundation at the close of the First Messenian War till the sixth century of the common era, when it is mentioned by Hierocles. It is spoken of by Herodotus as a town of the Dryopes, and its name occurs in the history of the Peloponnesian War, and in subsequent events. When the Messenians returned to their own country after the Battle of Leuctra, 371 BCE, the Asinaeans were not molested by them; and even in the time of Pausanias (2nd century) they still gloried in the name of Dryopes.

Its site is located near the modern Koroni, which is situated upon a hill jutting out into the sea above Cape Acritas. The ancient town of Corone was situated further north; and it has been reasonably conjectured that the inhabitants of Corone removed from their town to the deserted site of Asine, and carried with them their ancient name – such a migration of names not being uncommon in Greece.

== See also ==
- List of ancient Greek cities
