= Jean-Paul James =

French prelate of the Catholic Church (born 1952)

The Most Reverend Jean-Paul James
- Archbishop of Bordeaux
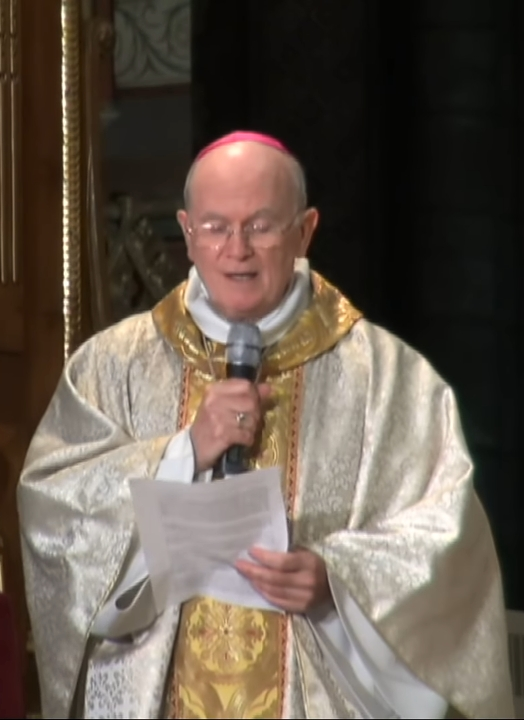
- Church: Roman Catholic Church
- Archdiocese: Bordeaux
- See: Bordeaux
- Appointed: 14 November 2019
- Installed: 26 January 2020
- Predecessor: Jean-Pierre Bernard Ricard
- Previous posts: Bishop of Beauvais (2003-09); Bishop of Nantes (2009-19)

Orders
- Ordination: 22 September 1985
- Consecration: 6 April 2003 by François de Sales Marie Adrien Saint-Macary

Personal details
- Born: Jean-Paul André Denis Marcel James; 14 July 1952 (age 74) Rennes, France
- Education: Institut National de Sciences Economiques; Pontifical Gregorian University
- Motto: Nos sumus servi tui quia Iesu
- Coat of arms

Jean-Paul James (born 14 July 1952) is a French prelate of the Catholic Church who was named Archbishop of Bordeaux in November 2019 after serving from 2003 to 2009 as Bishop of Beauvais and from 2009 to 2019 as Bishop of Nantes.

== Biography ==
Jean-Paul André Denis Marcel James was born on 14 July 1952 in Rennes. He studied at the Catholic schools of the Assumption and Saint-Vincent there. He earned a licentiate in economic sciences at the Institut National de Sciences Economiques (INSEE) in Paris. In 1984 at the Saint-Yves major seminary of Rennes he obtained a bachelor's degree. He completed his studies in theology at the French Seminary in Rome and received a licentiate in canon law and a degree in moral theology at the Pontifical Gregorian University. He was ordained a priest on 22 September 1985.

He worked as parish vicar in the Saint-Augustin parish in Rennes from 1985 to 1987 and then assisted at the parish of Saint-Louis des Français for two years, while studying in Rome. From 1990 to 1999 he was professor of moral theology at the major seminary of Rennes and head of the Diocesan Vocational Service. In 1999 he became rector of that seminary. From 1990 on he was also an assistant at a home for the disabled in Bruz, part of the l'Arche network founded by Jean Vanier.

Pope John Paul II named him Bishop of Beauvais on 9 January 2003, and he received his episcopal consecration on 6 April. On 8 July 2008 Pope Benedict XVI appointed him Bishop of Nantes. He has been a member of the Councils for Interreligious Relations and for New Religious Movements of the Episcopal Conference of France.

Pope Francis named him Archbishop of Bordeaux on 14 November 2019. His installation in Bordeaux took place on 26 January 2020.
