= Colonides =

Town in ancient Messenia

Coordinates: 36°50′10″N 21°55′44″E

Colonides or Kolonides (Ancient Greek: Κολωνίδες), also known as Colonis or Kolonis (Κολωνίς) or as Colone or Kolone (Κολώνη), was a town in the southwest of ancient Messenia described by Pausanias as standing upon a height at a short distance from the sea, and 40 stadia from Asine. The inhabitants affirmed that they were not Messenians, but a colony led from Athens by Colaenus. It is mentioned by Plutarch as a place which Philopoemen marched to relieve leading to his capture and execution; but according to the narrative of Livy, Corone was the place towards which Philopoemen marched.

Its site is located near the modern Vournaria.
