= Aepeia (Messenia) =

Aepeia or Aipeia (Ancient Greek: Αἴπεια) was a town of ancient Messenia. It is mentioned by Homer in the Iliad as one of the seven Messenian towns, offered by Agamemnon to Achilles. It is supposed by Strabo to be the same as Thuria, and by Pausanias the same as Corone.

Its site is dependent on which, if either, identification is accepted.
