= Aepeia (Cyprus) =

Aepeia or Aipeia (Ancient Greek: Αἴπεια) was a town of ancient Cyprus, situated on a mountain, the ruler of which is said to have removed to the plain, upon the advice of Solon, and to have named the new town Soli in honour of the Athenian. As of the 19th century, there was still a place, called Epe, upon the mountain above the ruins of Soli.

Clarius (Κλάριος) was a small stream which ran near the town.
