= Thuria (Messenia) =

Town of ancient Messenia

Coordinates: 37°06′48″N 22°03′05″E

- Thouria
- Interactive map of Thuria (Messenia)

Thuria or Thouria (Ancient Greek: Θουρία) was a town of ancient Messenia, situated in the eastern part of the southern Messenian plain, upon the river Aris, at 80 stadia from Pharae, which was about a mile (1.6 km) from the coast.

Recent excavations have revealed the theatre from the early Hellenistic period, a temple and the city walls.

It was generally identified with the Homeric Antheia, though others supposed it to be Aepeia.

It must have been a place of considerable importance, since the distant Messenian Gulf was even named after it (ὁ Θουριάτης κόλπος). It was also one of the chief towns of the Lacedaemonian Perioeci after the subjugation of Messenia; and it was here that the Third Messenian War arose in 464 BC.

On the restoration of the Messenians by Epaminondas, Thuria, like the other towns in the country, was dependent upon the newly-founded capital Messene; but after the capture of that city by the Achaeans in 182 BC, Thuria, Pharae, and Abia joined the Achaean League as independent members. Thuria was annexed to Laconia by Augustus; but it was restored to Messenia by Tiberius.

Pausanias found two cities of this name. The original city on the acropolis is on the hill above the village of Paleókastro and divided from the range of mountains named Makryplái by a deep ravine and torrent, and which commands a fine view of the plain and gulf. A temple of the Syrian Goddess stood within the town walls. The remains of the walls extend half a mile (800 m) along the summit of the hill. Near the centre of the ruins is a quadrangular cistern, 10 or 12 feet (3 or 4 m) deep, cut out of the rock at one end, and on the other side constructed of masonry. The cistern was divided into three parts by two cross walls. Its whole length is 29 paces; the breadth half as much. On the highest part of the ridge there are numerous ruins, among which are those of a small Doric temple, of a hard brown calcareous stone in which are cockle and mussel shells.

The later lower city was on the plain at Paleá Lutra where are the ruins of a large Roman building, standing in the middle of fig and mulberry grounds. William Martin Leake, who visited in the 19th century, observed that "it is in an uncommon state of preservation, part even of the roof still remaining. The walls are 17 feet high, formed of equal courses of Roman tiles and mortar. The roof is of rubble mixed with cement. The plan does not seem to be that of a bath only, as the name would imply, though there are many appearances of the building having contained baths: it seems rather to have been the palace of some Roman governor. As there are no sources of water here, it is to be supposed that the building was supplied by an aqueduct from the neighbouring river of Pídhima."

Its site is near the modern Aithaia/Hellenika.
