= December 5 (Eastern Orthodox liturgics) =

Day in the Eastern Orthodox liturgical calendar

Eastern Orthodox liturgical calendar
December 4	December 5	December 6
December 5 O.S. ≍ December 18 N.S. December 5 N.S ≍ November 22 O.S.

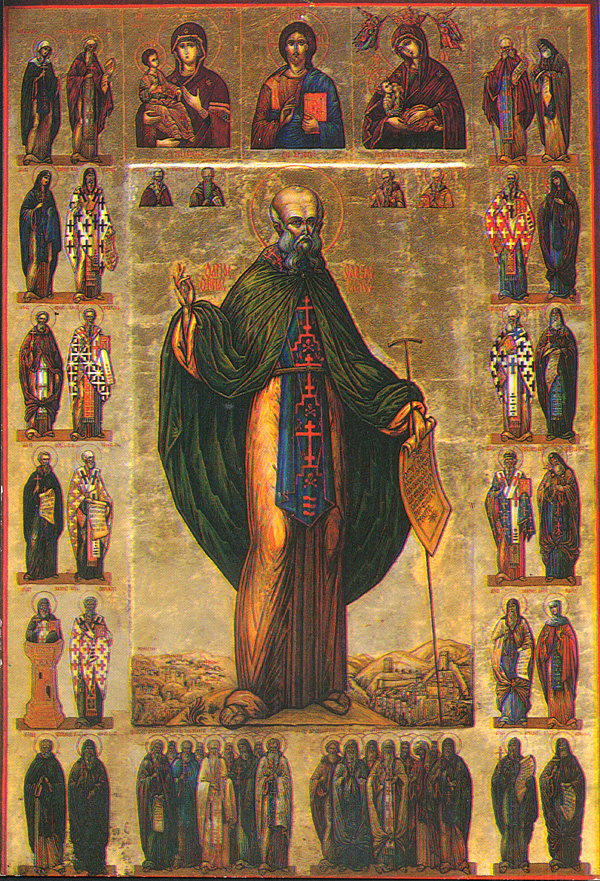
Saint Sabbas the Sanctified (center). (Icon of the 'Synaxis of the Saints Who Practiced Asceticism in the Holy Lavra of Saint Sabbas'). (Note: The 'Synaxis of the Saints Who Practiced Asceticism in the Holy Lavra of Saint Sabbas', is commemorated on the Third Sunday of Matthew.)

December 5 in Eastern Orthodox liturgical calendars is a feast day and a day of commemoration of saints and martyrs. Although some Orthodox churches use the Revised Julian Calendar and others use the traditional Julian calendar, the fixed commemorations for their respective December 5 are broadly the same, no matter which calendar is used. (Note: Despite the dates being the same, the days to which they refer typically differ by 13 days. The notation Old Style or O.S. is sometimes used to indicate a date in the traditional Julian Calendar (the "Old Calendar"). The notation New Style or N.S. indicates a date in the Revised Julian calendar (the "New Calendar").)

== Saints ==
- Martyr Anastasios the Fuller of Salona in Dalmatia (4th century) (Note: Anastasius would visit the martyrs of the faith who were imprisoned, bringing them food and supplies and tending to their wounds. With this fervent faith, he one day witnessed to the local magistrate, who had imprisoned the Christians, that in vain were his attempts to drown the work of God. For this reason he was tortured and ultimately beheaded.) (see also: October 25)
- Venerable Gratus, monk. (Note: In some Synaxaria he is listed as the Bishop of Ephesus, together with the Venerable Nonnus.)
- Venerable Nonnus, monk.
- Martyr Diogenes, by stoning. (Note: Name days celebrated today include: Diogenes, Diogenis (Διογένης).)
- Martyr Abercius, by the sword.
- Venerable Karion (Cyrion) and his son Saint Zachariah of Egypt (4th century) (see also: November 24)
- Saint Sabbas the Sanctified (532) (Note: Name days celebrated today include: Savvas, Savas (Σάββας); Savvoula (Σαββούλα): Saba, Sabi, Sabrina.) (Note: "AT Mutala, in Cappadocia, St. Sabas, abbot, who was renowned in Palestine for admirable examples of sanctity. He labored courageously in defending the Catholic faith against those who attacked the holy Council of Chalcedon.")

== Pre-Schism Western saints ==
- Saint Bassus of Nice, Bishop of Nice, martyred under Decius, his body transfixed with two huge nails (c. 250) (Note: "At Nicaea, near the river Var, St. Bassus, bishop. In the persecution of Decius and Valerian, he was tortured by the governor Perennius for the faith of Christ, burned with hot plates of metal, beaten with rods and whips garnished with pieces of iron, and thrown into the fire. Having come out of it unhurt, he was transfixed with two spikes, and thus terminated an illustrious martyrdom.")
- Martyrs Julius, Potamia, Crispin, Felix, Gratus and Companions - 12 martyrs who suffered in Thagura in Numidia in North Africa under Diocletian (302) (Note: "At Thagura, in Africa, the holy martyrs Julius, Potamia, Crispinus, Felix, Gratus, and seven others.")
- Saint Crispina of Numidia, a wealthy woman in Thebeste in Numidia in North Africa, who was horribly tortured and ultimately beheaded (304) (Note: "At Thebesta, in Africa, during the time of Diocletian and Maximian, St. Chrispina, a woman of the highest nobility, who refused to sacrifice to idols, and was beheaded by order of the proconsul Anolinus. Her praises are often celebrated by St. Augustine.")
- Saint Dalmatius of Pavia, Bishop of Pavia, martyred under Maximianus Herculius (304)
- Martyr Pelinus, Bishop of Brindisi, martyred in Confinium in the south of Italy, under Julian the Apostate (361) (Note: "At Pelino, in Abruzzo, St. Pelinus, Bishop of Brindisi. Under Julian the Apostate, because by his prayers he caused a temple of Mars to fall to the ground, he was most severely scourged by the idolatrous priests, and being pierced with eighty-five wounds, merited the crown of martyrdom.")
- Monk-martyr Justinian of Ramsey Island (Iestin), South Wales (560) (Note: "ST. JUSTINIAN appears to have been a native of Continental Brittany, and to have come over to Wales, in order to serve God in detachment from all worldly connections. By his holy conversation he drew many souls to God, but at length feeling himself called to a more complete solitude, he crossed over to the Isle of Ramsey, where he found the holy hermit HONORIUS already settled. The two Saints lived together, helping one another by prayers and good counsels in their unwearied efforts after Christian perfection. Justinian lived in the time of St. David, who had a high veneration for his sanctity, and was accustomed to visit him on his island. At length the holy man was barbarously murdered by some wicked men, whose vices he had severely reproved, or, as some say, by pirates, who had landed on that shore. He died in a holy cause, and has received from the devotion of the faithful the glorious title of Martyr. The body of St. Justinian was taken to the mainland, and buried with honour.")
- Saint Nicetius (Nizerius), Bishop of Trier, Gaul (566) (Note: The last of the Gallo-Roman bishops of Trier in Germany, consecrated in 532. He had been a monk and abbot in his native Auvergne in France. As a bishop he withstood the cruelty of the Franks by whom he was exiled for a time. He restored discipline among the clergy, rebuilt the cathedral and combated heresy.)
- Saint Friminus, the seventh Bishop of Verdun in France (6th century)
- Saint Cawrdaf, a noble in Wales, ended his life as a monk with St Illtyd (6th century)
- Saint Sigiranus (Cyran, Siran, Sigram), abbot and confessor (c. 655) (Note: Born in a noble family, he became Archdeacon of Tours in France, where his father was bishop. Then he became a monk and founded monasteries at Méobecq and Lonrey (Longoretum). The latter was called Saint-Cyran after him.)
- Saint Gerbold, monk at Ebriciacum in France, later founded the monastery of Livray, became Bishop of Bayeux (690)
- Saint Basilissa, Abbess of Oehren (de) near Trier in Germany (c. 780)
- Saint John Gradenigo, a monk in Cuxa Abbey in the Catalan Pyrenees in Spain, reposed as a hermit near Montecassino (1025)

== Post-Schism Orthodox saints ==
- Venerable Philotheus (Philotheos) the Righteous, of Karyes, Mount Athos, Elder of St. Nectarius the Athonite (late 15th century)
- Venerable Nectarius (Nectarios, Nektarios) the Bulgarian of Bitol and Karyes, Mount Athos (1500) (Note: The Monk Nektarios was raised by his father, who had accepted monasticism at the monastery of the holy Unmercenaries Cosmas and Damian in Bitolia (Bulgaria). He himself accepted tonsure on Holy Mount Athos, and did his obedience under experienced spiritual guides – the Monk Philotheos and the spiritual-elder Dionysios. Like Job, the monk experienced being struck down by exceptional bodily afflictions, and he peacefully gave up his soul to the Lord on 5 December 1500. Uncovered four years later, the holy relics of the saint exuded a wondrous fragrance.)
- Saint Gurias, Archbishop of Kazan (1563)

=== New martyrs and confessors ===
- Venerable New Martyrs of Karyes Skete on Mount Athos: Kosmas (Cosmas) the Protos of Vatopedi and Companions, killed by the Latins (1280) (Note: They were hagiorites from various cells of the Karyes Skete on Mount Athos, who resisted Emperor Michael VIII Palaiologos and the Latinophile Patriarch John XI Bekkos, and received a martyric end. The first one of these was hanged, while the rest were beheaded.)
- New Hieromartyr Elias Chetverukhin, Priest of Moscow (1932) (Note: See: (in Russian) Четверухин, Илья Николаевич. Википедии. (Russian Wikipedia).)
- New Hieromartyr Gennadius Petlyuk (Letyuk), Priest-monk of Yaroslavl-Rostov (1941)
- New Confessor Sergius Pravdolyubov, Priest of Ryazan (1950)

== Icon gallery ==
St. Sabbas the Sanctified.
(Menologion of Basil II, 10th century).

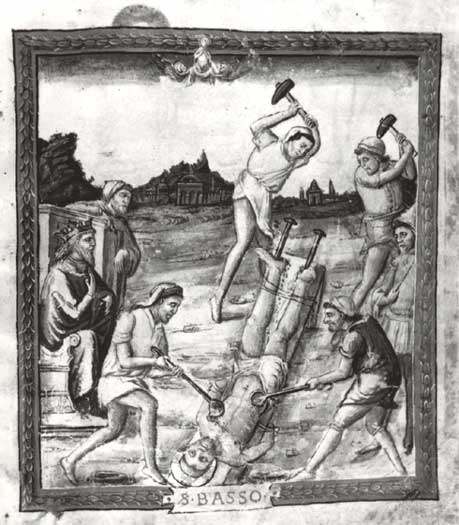
Martyrdom of St. Bassus of Nice, Bishop of Nice.

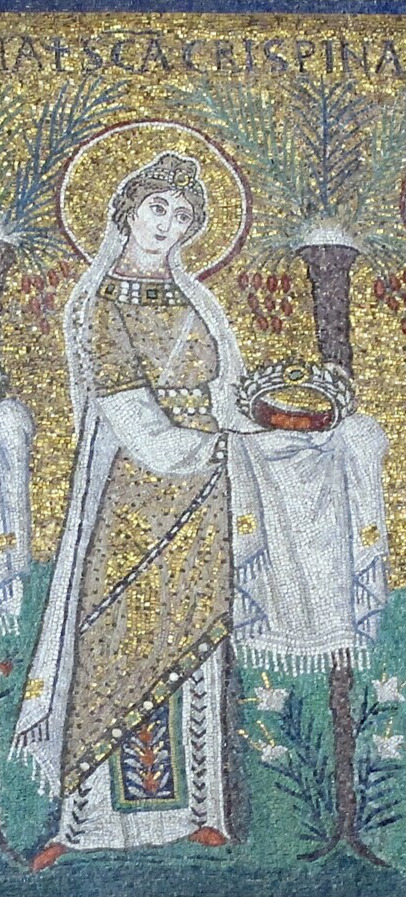
St. Crispina of Numidia.

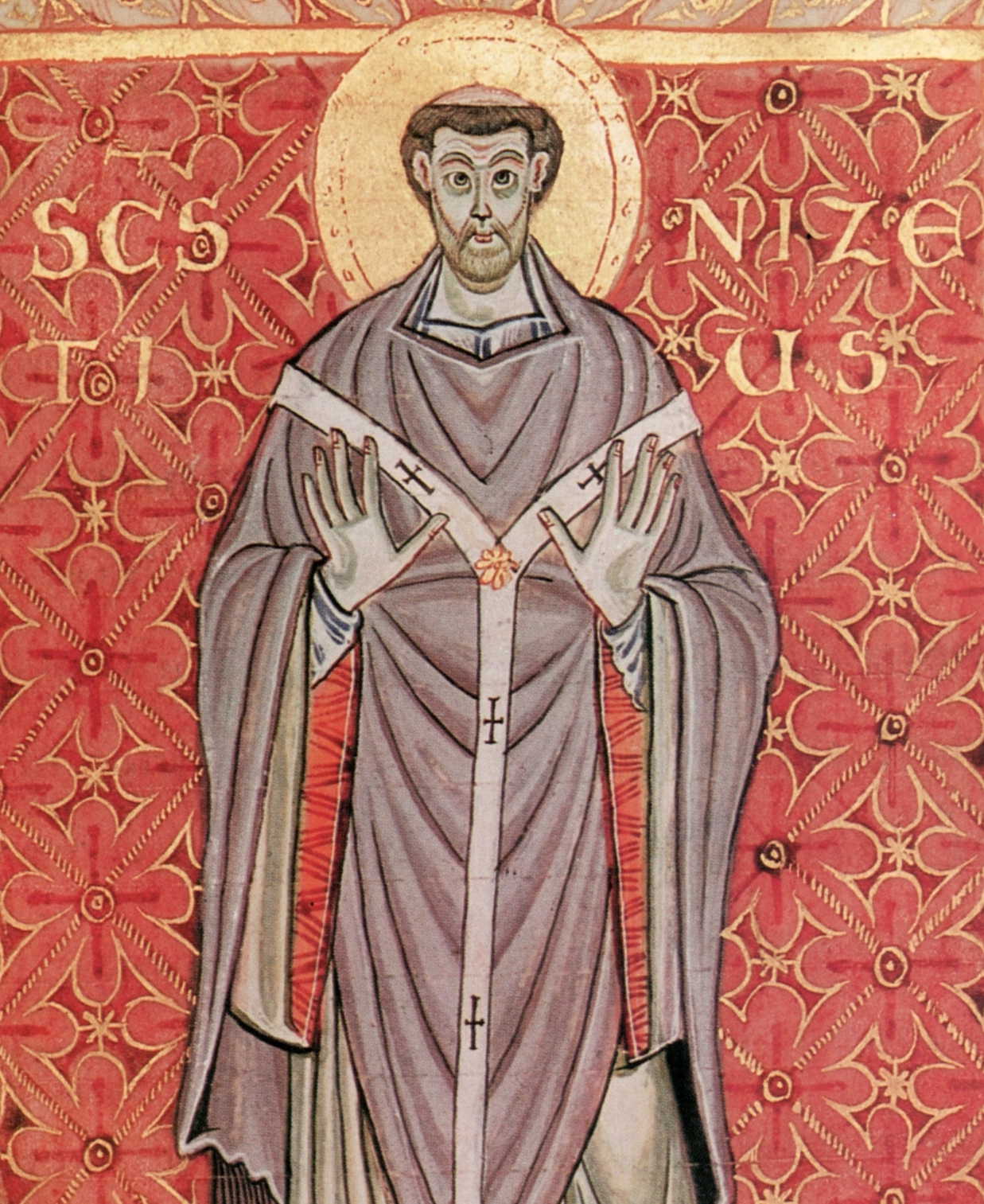
St. Nicetius, Bishop of Trier (Egbert-Psalter, 10th century).

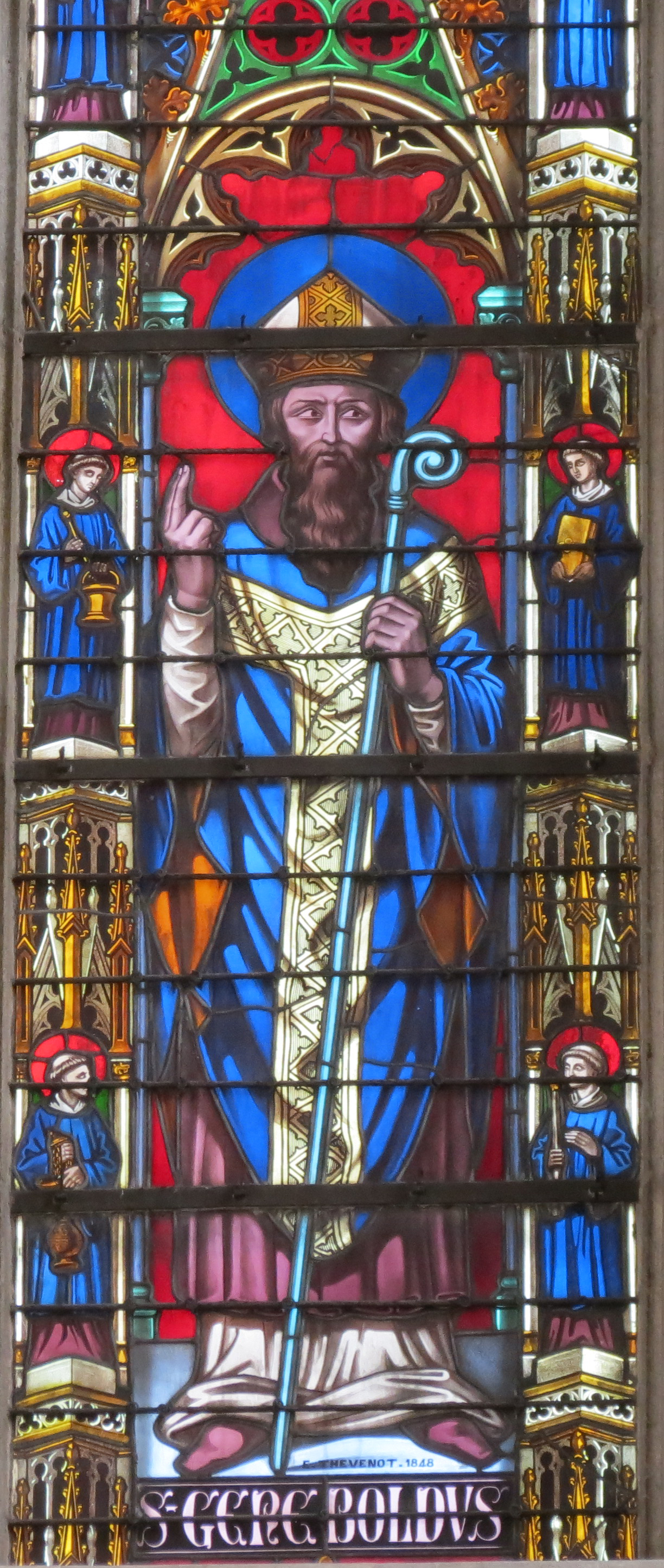
St. Gereboldus of Bayeux.

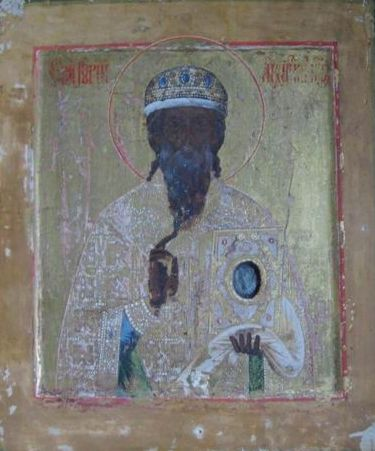
St. Gurias, Archbishop of Kazan.

== Sources ==
- December 5/18. Orthodox Calendar (PRAVOSLAVIE.RU).
- December 18 / December 5. HOLY TRINITY RUSSIAN ORTHODOX CHURCH (A parish of the Patriarchate of Moscow).
- December 5. OCA - The Lives of the Saints.
- December 5. Latin Saints of the Orthodox Patriarchate of Rome.
- The Roman Martyrology. Transl. by the Archbishop of Baltimore. Last Edition, According to the Copy Printed at Rome in 1914. Revised Edition, with the Imprimatur of His Eminence Cardinal Gibbons. Baltimore: John Murphy Company, 1916. pp. 374–375.
- Rev. Richard Stanton. A Menology of England and Wales, or, Brief Memorials of the Ancient British and English Saints Arranged According to the Calendar, Together with the Martyrs of the 16th and 17th Centuries. London: Burns & Oates, 1892. pp. 585-587.

Greek Sources

- Great Synaxaristes: (in Greek) 5 ΔΕΚΕΜΒΡΙΟΥ. ΜΕΓΑΣ ΣΥΝΑΞΑΡΙΣΤΗΣ.
- (in Greek) Συναξαριστής. 5 Δεκεμβρίου. ECCLESIA.GR. (H ΕΚΚΛΗΣΙΑ ΤΗΣ ΕΛΛΑΔΟΣ).

Russian Sources

- (in Russian) 18 декабря (5 декабря). Православная Энциклопедия под редакцией Патриарха Московского и всея Руси Кирилла (электронная версия). (Orthodox Encyclopedia - Pravenc.ru).
- (in Russian) 5 декабря (ст.ст.) 18 декабря 2014 (нов. ст.). Русская Православная Церковь Отдел внешних церковных связей. (DECR).
