= Abbey of Saint Pons =

Abbey of Saint Pons may refer to:

- Abbey of Saint-Pons de Nice
- Abbey of Saint-Pons-de-Thomières
- Abbey of Saint-Pons de Gémenos
