= Hospitius =

6th-century Christian saint

Saint Hospitius
- Born: early sixth century Egypt
- Died: 21 May 581; Cap Ferrat (near Villefranche-sur-Mer), Gaul (modern-day France)
- Venerated in: Roman Catholic Church; Eastern Orthodox Church
- Beatified: Pre-Congregation
- Canonized: Pre-Congregation
- Major shrine: Cathedral of Saint Reparata, Nice; Relics also kept in the Churches of La Turbie and Villefranche-sur-Mer
- Feast: 21 May
- Attributes: Depicted as an old man, in the garb of a hermit or monk

Hospitius (in French, Hospice and anciently Sospis; died 21 May 581) was a French recluse who, according to tradition, had been a monk in his native Egypt towards the beginning of the 6th century. He immigrated to Gaul and retired to a dilapidated tower, situated on the peninsula of Cap Ferrat, a few miles east of Nice.

The people of the environs frequently consulted him; he forewarned them on one occasion, about the year 575, of an impending incursion of the Lombards. Hospitius was seized by these raiders, but his life was spared. He worked a miracle in favor of one of the warriors, who became converted, embraced the religious life, and was known personally to Gregory of Tours. It was from him that Gregory, to whom we are indebted for the meagre details of the saint's life, learned of the austerities and numerous miracles of the recluse. Hospitius foretold his death and was buried by his friend, Austadius, Bishop of Cimiez.

Hospitius died at Cap Ferrat (sometimes called Cap Saint-Sospis or Cap Saint-Hospice), near Villefranche-sur-Mer, in the department of Alpes-Maritimes.

== Veneration ==
Hospitius is still venerated in the Diocese of Nice at the Cathedral of Saint Reparata. The cathedral church possesses a small bone of his hand; other relics are kept in the churches of Villefranche-sur-Mer, La Turbie, and San-Sospis.
