= Syagrius of Nice =

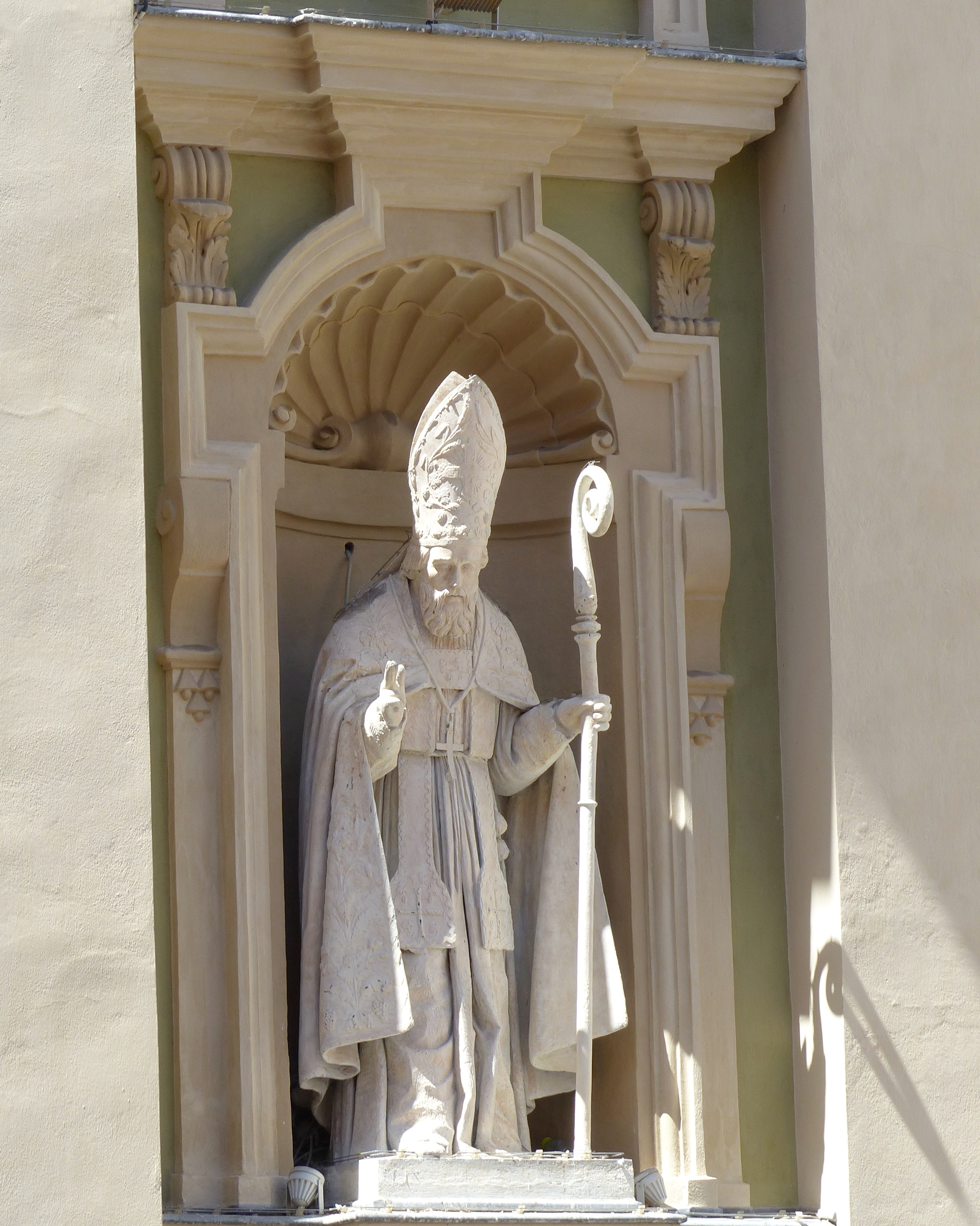
Saint Syagrius: statue on the west front of Nice Cathedral

Syagrius (d. 787 or 788) was the bishop of Nice and the legendary founder and first abbot of the abbey of Saint-Pons de Cimiez. He is considered a saint by the Catholic Church and in the Eastern Orthodox Church.

Originally a monk from Lérins Abbey, Syagrius founded the abbey of Saint Pons in 775-777. Legend describes him as a nephew of Charlemagne but his dates do not support such a relationship.

Syagrius's vita relates that as a man he was discreet, always active and full of zeal for the salvation of souls, and that he performed a miracle by resurrecting a child killed by a horse.

Syagrius died in 787 or 788. His feast day is on 23 May.
