= Cimiez Cathedral =

Roman Catholic church in Nice, France

Coordinates: 43°41′45″N 7°16′52″E

Cimiez Cathedral Cathédrale Sainte-Marie de Cimiez
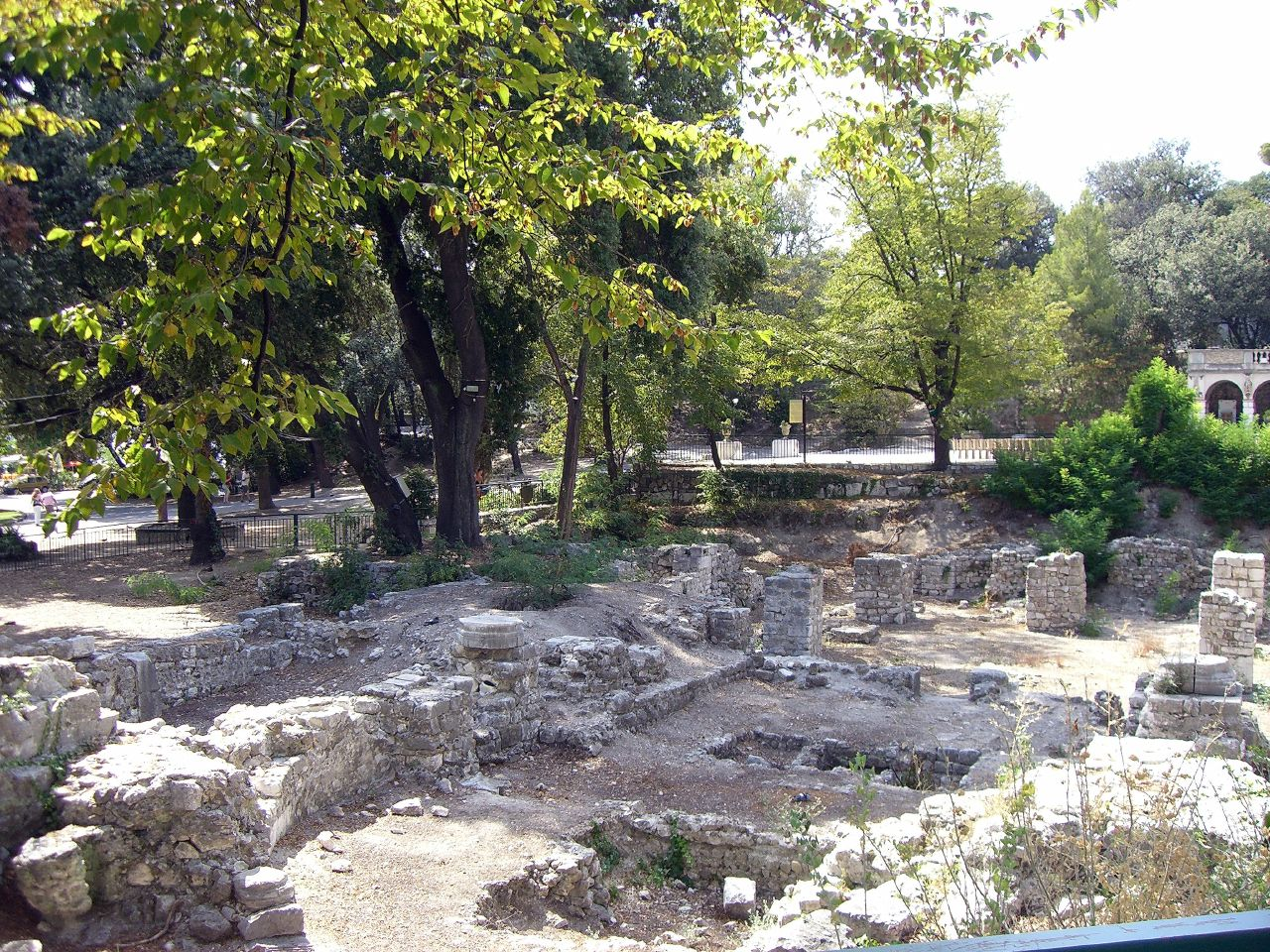
- Cimiez Cathedral

Religion
- Affiliation: Roman Catholic Church
- Province: Diocese of Cimiez
- Region: Alpes-Maritimes
- Rite: Roman
- Ecclesiastical or organisational status: Cathedral
- Status: Active

Location
- Location: Nice, France
- Interactive map of Cimiez Cathedral; Cathédrale Sainte-Marie de Cimiez

Architecture
- Type: church
- Style: Romanesque
- Groundbreaking: 10th century
- Completed: 15th century

Cimiez Cathedral (French: Cathédrale Sainte-Marie de Cimiez, also Cathédrale Notre-Dame du Château) was a Roman Catholic church in the southern town of Nice, France. The cathedral sat on the hill of the Château de Nice, a castle overlooking the city. The bishop's seat was transferred to the present Nice Cathedral in 1590. After incurring damage in the Siege of Nice in 1691, the former cathedral was demolished in 1706.

== History ==
Cimiez Cathedral was initially the episcopal seat of the Diocese of Cimiez established in the Roman port of Cemenelum, the precursor of the modern Cimiez, and joined to the Diocese of Nice as early as 465, after which its cathedral became the seat of the Bishops of Nice.

The first cathedral on the castle hill site was built in Pre-Romanesque architecture style at the end of the 10th century. Its high altar was consecrated in 1049. The building contained three aisles, but no transept, and a choir with three apses.

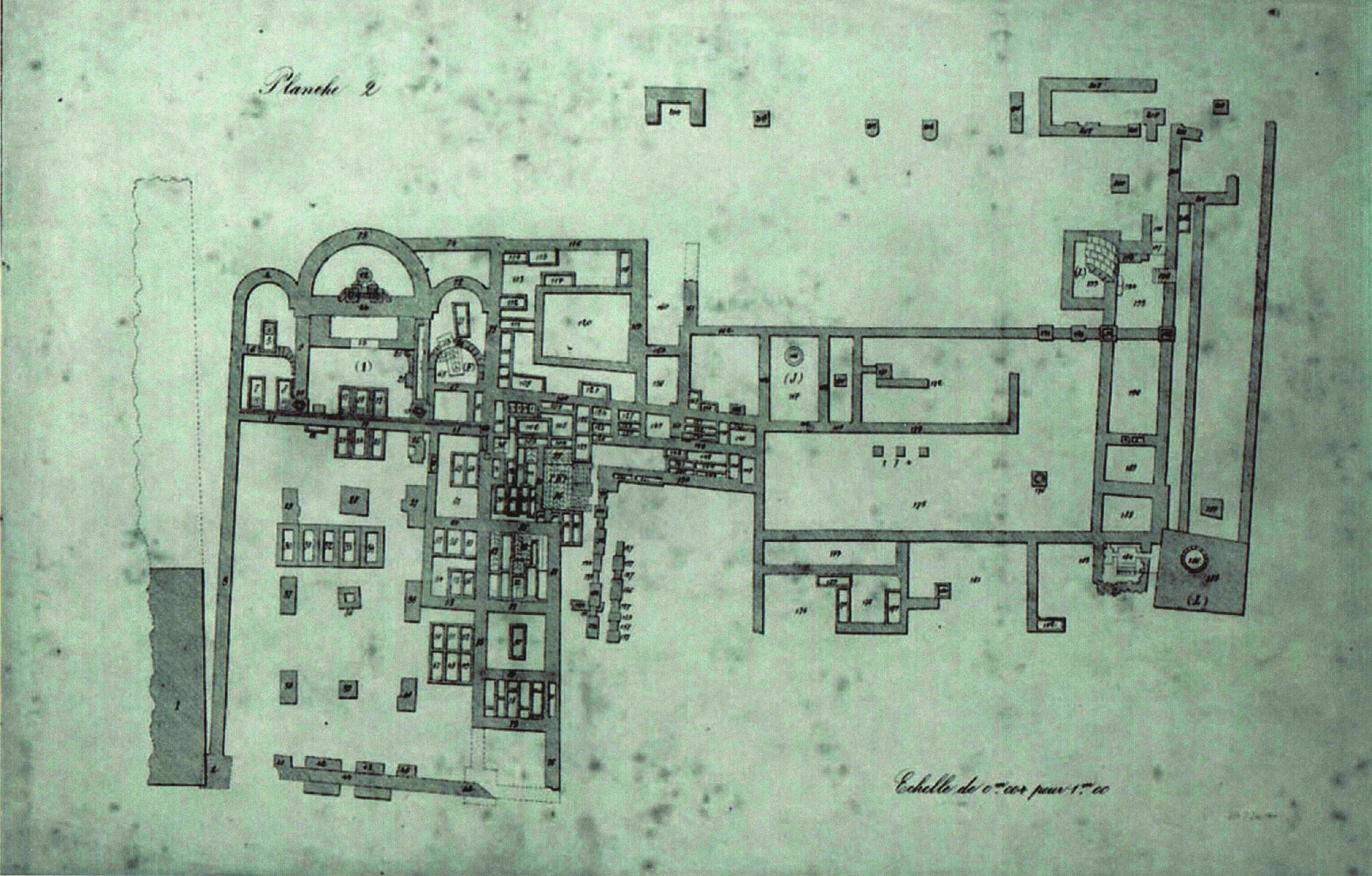
Plan of the cathedral based on archaeological investigations in 1875

This church had become extremely dilapidated by the 13th century, when it was rebuilt on the same plan, but with an extension to the east. Further works were carried out in the 15th century, including the addition of several chapels, as confirmed by a bull of Pope Martin V of 1429.

The bishop's functions were gradually transferred to the church, later cathedral, of St. Reparata in the early 16th century. The formal transfer of the bishop's seat to St. Reparata's, with its consequent elevation to a cathedral, was finally confirmed in 1590.

The former cathedral was severely damaged during the Siege of Nice by Catinat in 1691, and was demolished entirely in 1706.

== Sources ==
- Hildesheimer, Françoise (dir.), 1997: Les diocèses de Nice et Monaco. Beauchesne, coll. Histoire des diocèses de France, Paris ISBN 978-2-7010-1095-3 Online at googlebooks
