= Abbey of Saint-Pons de Nice =

Abbey in Alpes-Maritimes, France

Abbey of Saint Pons
- Abbaye Saint-Pons de Nice
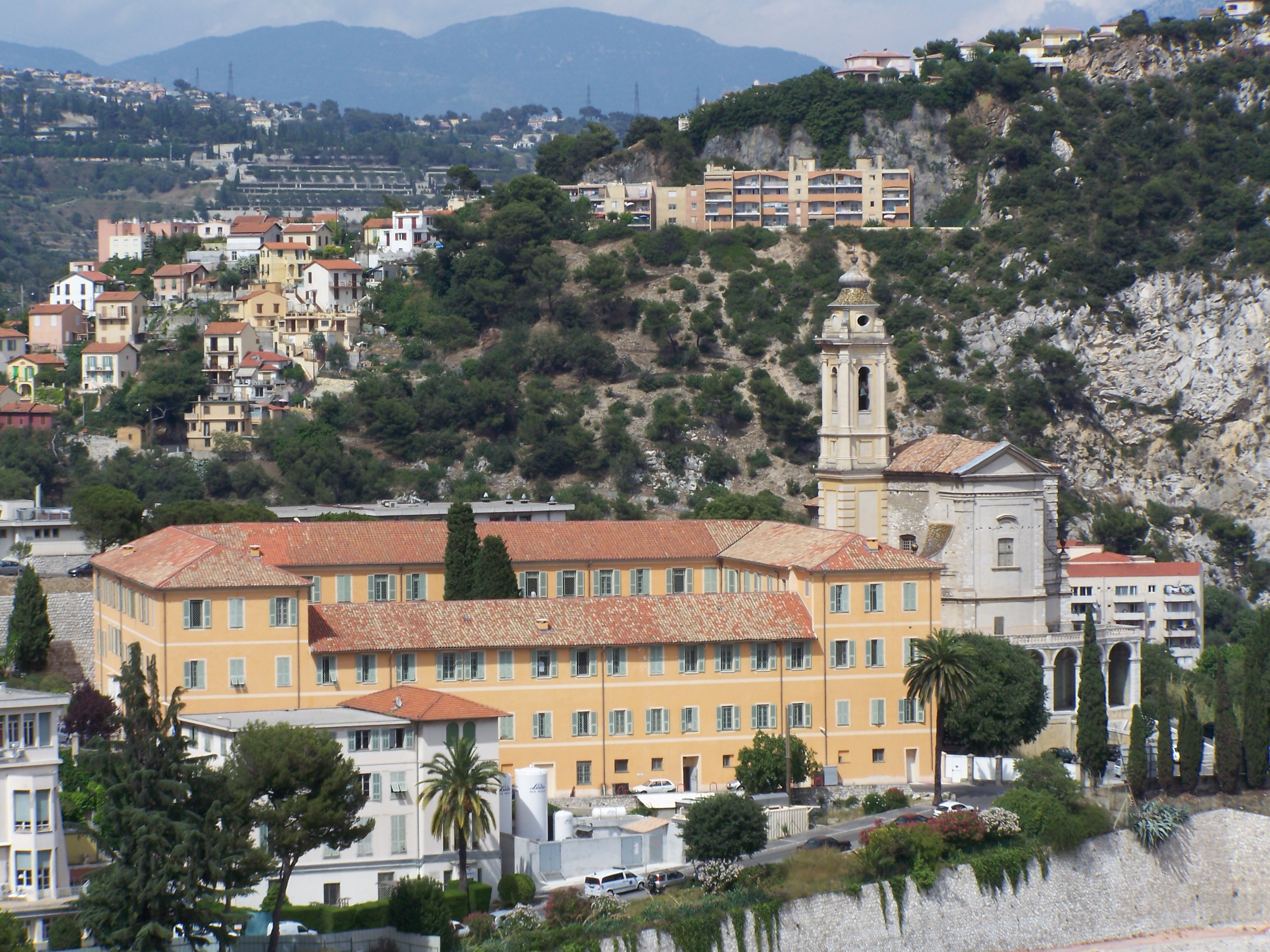
- Abbey of St Pons from the north

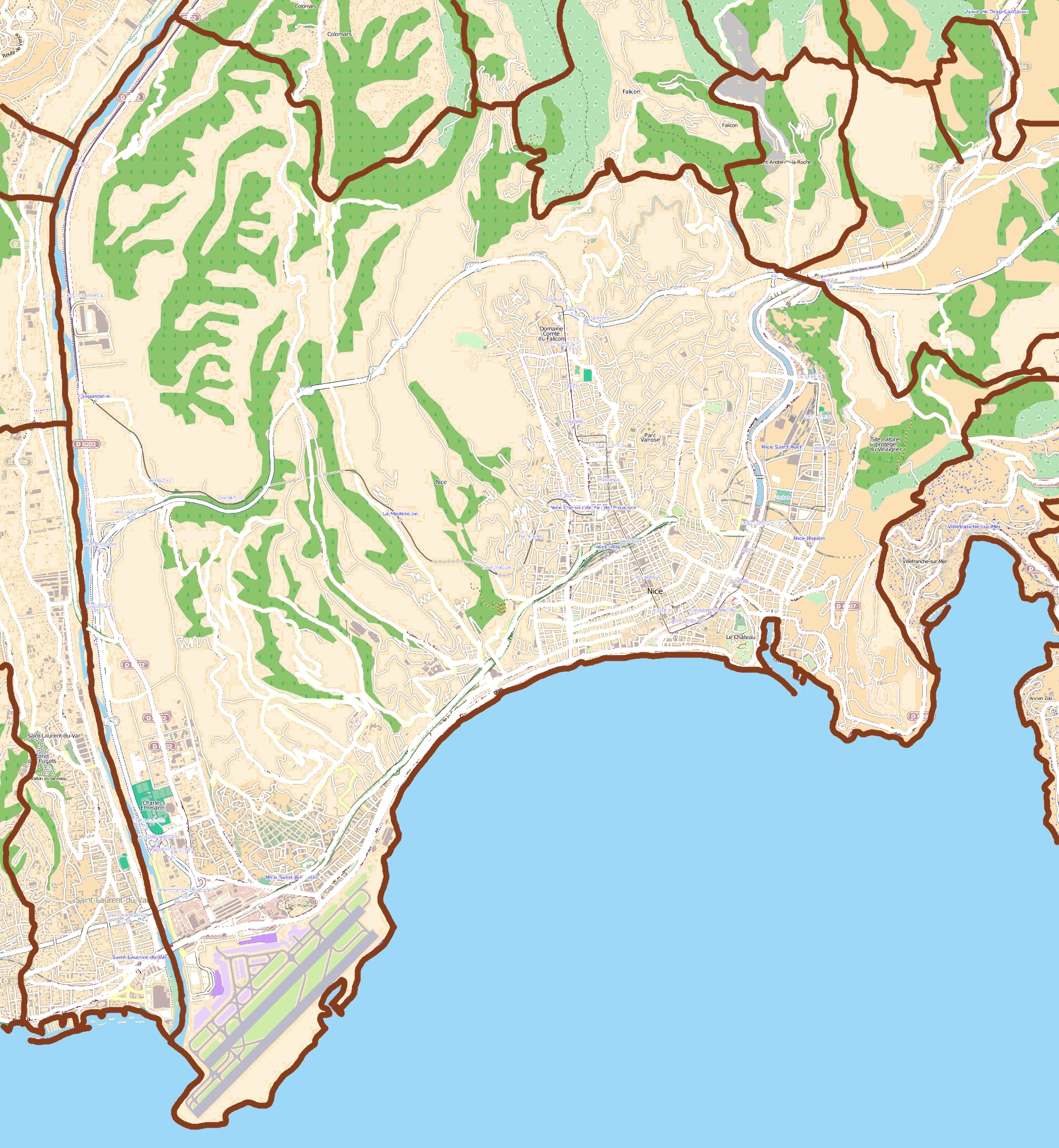
- Location within Nice

Monastery information
- Order: Benedictine
- Established: 774-800
- Disestablished: 1860
- Diocese: Nice

People
- Founder: Syagrius of Nice

Site
- Location: Nice, Alpes-Maritimes, France
- Coordinates: 43.725°N 7.283°E

The Abbey of Saint Pons (French: Abbaye Saint-Pons de Nice) is one of the oldest monasteries on the French Riviera, along with Lérins Abbey. It is located in the municipality of Nice in the Alpes-Maritimes. The original abbey was constructed between 774 and 800 and entrusted to the Benedictines. However, in 890, it was destroyed by the Saracens during a failed attack on Nice. The church was rebuilt in 1724 in Baroque style.

In 1860 it became the property of the French state and the monastery was dissolved. The building was then sold to the city of Nice for the sum of 60,000 francs. It was later transformed into an annex to the Hospital of Saint Roche. The church remained under sequestration until its transformation into Saint Pons parish. It was classified as a historical monument of national importance in 1913. The façades and roofs of the abbey and cloister were classified as being of regional importance in 1949.

The abbey is now part of the Pasteur Hospital.

== The life of Saint Pons ==
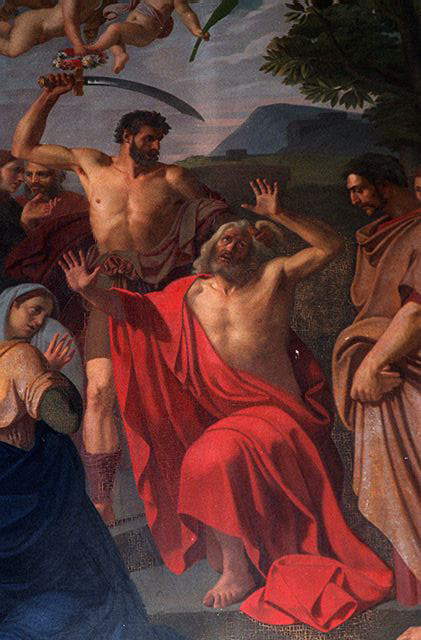
Joseph Castel (1798-1853), Le Martyre de saint Pons (The Martyrdom of Saint Pons), Saint-Pons of Nice

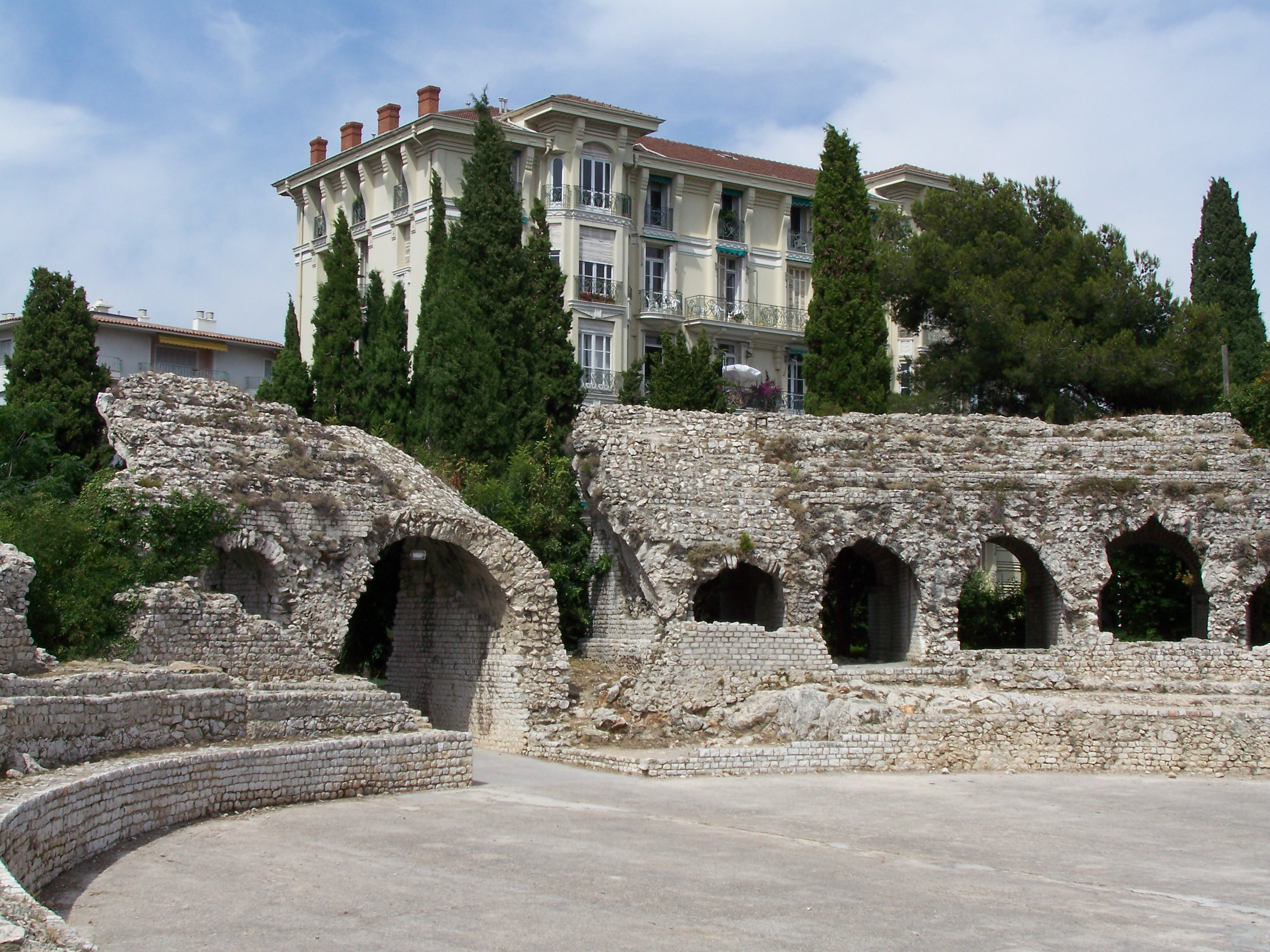
Ruins of the Roman arenas (fr:arènes de Cimiez)

About thirty copies of the Passion de Saint Pons exist in French and foreign libraries.

The Passion, whose earliest two known copies date from the 9th or 10th century, has been transcribed or printed dozens times since.

Pontius was the son of a Roman senator. When he was very young, he and his family were persuaded by Pope Pontian to convert to Christianity. Upon the death of his father, Pontius became a senator and gave all his possessions to Pope Fabian (236-250) to be distributed among the poor. He used his position in society to convert Emperor Philip the Arab (244-249) and his son.

Christians were subject to persecution during the reigns of Valerian (253-260) and Gallienus (253-268), so Pontius left Italy to settle in Cimiez. However, Claudius, the governor of Gaul, implemented the imperial policy of persecuting Christians, resulting in Pontius being arrested. For refusing to sacrifice to the pagan gods, he was sentenced to death. After several attempts at execution were ineffective, such as being thrown to two bears in the amphitheatre and being burnt at the stake, he was finally beheaded on a rock overlooking the banks of the Paillon; his body was then pushed off a cliff. His martyrdom is traditionally dated at 257 or 258 AD.

Saint Pons was buried in a necropolis located at the site of the future abbey. According to a legend, his head rolled into the river and was carried away by sea to Marseilles, where the relic was taken in by the monks of the Abbey of St. Victor. The supposed place of martyrdom stood on a rock overlooking the Paillon on a cliff. A chapel dedicated to Saint Pons stood on the rock overlooking the Paillon until it was destroyed by a landslide in 1925.

== History of the abbey ==
In 1925, Bonaventure Salvetti, then curator of the parish of Saint-Pons, published a historical essay entitled L'Abbaye de Saint-Pons hors les murs de Nice (The Abbey of Saint Pons outside the walls of Nice). The essay states the abbey was founded in 775 AD by Charlemagne, and that Saint Syagrius was its first abbot. However, this account is not considered to be reliable as it is largely based on the Vita Siacrii, a document which is not referenced before the beginning of the seventeenth century.

Bernard Gui reported in the fourteenth century that the body of the martyr had been deposited in a crypt under the church named Confessio. There are five fragments of a chancel dating to the Carolingian period and they are believed to be from this church. Three of these fragments feature an inscription commemorating the restoration of the tomb of Saint Pons under the rule of Charlemagne whose title (King of Franks and Lombards) and reign make it possible to pinpoint the event to between 774 and 800.

The monastery was entrusted to the Benedictines and became a centre of spiritual, intellectual, and economic development. However, in 890 the original abbey was destroyed by Saracens during a failed attack on Nice.

=== The Middle Ages ===
Following the expulsion of the Saracens from Provence in 973, the Benedictine abbey was restored and the ecclesiastical possessions granted by Charlemagne to the Abbey of Saint Pons were returned. Members of the local nobility, seeking to redeem their sins, endowed the abbey with agricultural land, olive groves, vineyards, shops, warehouses, and houses.

In the Middle Ages, the abbot of the monastery of Saint Pons occupied a prominent position among the nobility of Nice as one of the richest and most powerful men in the county. He was called "High and Mighty Lord" and enjoyed "honorific," "useful," and "justice" rights. The honorific rights allowed the abbot to be solemnly received in the abbey church and occupy the place of honour in the choir. He was permitted to carry the pectoral cross, the mitre, the crosier. As well as administering the abbey and the priories which depended on it, the useful rights allowed the abbot the rights of homage, grazing and pasture, and a monopoly on mills and ovens. He had the right to render justice on his subjects, although it is likely that this took the form of taxes, fines, and confiscations of good necessary for good administration.

By the twelfth century, the abbey was the richest in Nice and owned more than half of the city. Many churches were founded in Nice and the surrounding region by the monks of Saint-Pons, among them:

- Châteauneuf-de-Contes in 1030
- Sainte-Réparate de Nice in 1185
- Gordolon in 1185
- Sainte-Dévote de Monaco in 1206
- Saint-Nicolas de Sospel in 1229
- Saint-Simeon d'Ongran à Peille in 1229
- Notre-Dame du Moustier à Lucéram in 1233
- Saint-Hermentaire de Draguignan in 1235
- Notre-Dame des Salettes à Aspremont in 1248
- Notre-Dame de Falicon in 1248
- Saint-Blaise in 1248
- Saint-Pierre de l'Escarène in 1248
- Notre-Dame sous Gattières in 1248
- Notre-Dame des Prés à Levens in 1252
- Saint-Laurent d'Èze in 1291
- Notre-Dame des Salles près Draguignan in 1291
- Saint-Pierre d'Oliva au Broc in 1320
- Notre-Dame de Cimiez in 1346
- Notre-Dame de Virimanda à Annot in 1369
- Notre-Dame de Beaulieu-sur-Mer in 1593
- Saint-Giaume in 1576

On 28 September 1388, the surrender of Nice to Savoy was signed in the Abbey of Saint Pons.

=== Fragmentation ===
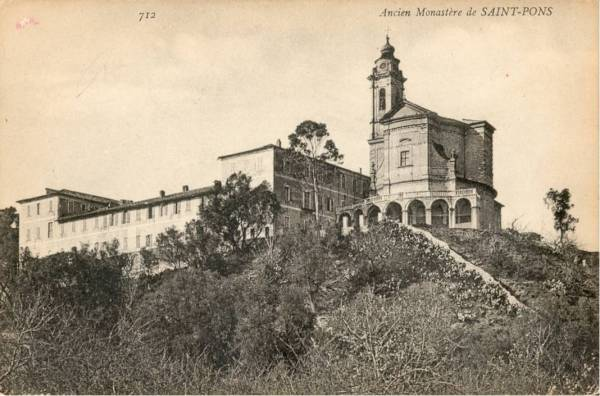
Abbaye Saint-Pons 1900.

As the Benedictine order declined in popularity, so did the seigneurial revenues, meaning the abbey could no longer maintain its community. Its remote churches became autonomous priories, and it yielded land to the new orders.

On 8 February 1366, Pope Urban V issued a papal bull placing the monastery of Saint Pons under the jurisdiction of the Abbey of Saint Victor of Marseille.

In 1473, the Bishop of Nice, Barthélémy Chuet, "commissioned" the Abbey of Saint Pons, reuniting its incomes with those of the bishop's palace. However, this was reversed on 11 May 1476 by a papal bull of Pope Sixtus IV.

In 1543, the monastery was damaged by the Turks during the siege of Nice.

The abbey was closed in 1792 by King Victor-Amadeus III of Sardinia, and the few remaining Benedictine monks sent to other monasteries. He joined the property and revenues of the abbey to his estate and mortgaged them in order to guarantee the loans needed to finance major public works in Piedmont, Savoy, and Nice.

During the French revolution of 1789, the monastery was converted into a military hospital for wounded Italian soldiers and vast estates were auctioned. In the year V of the French Republic, the buildings were placed under sequestration until the Concordat. Monseigneur Colonna, the bishop of Nice, acquired an Imperial Decree from Napoleon I on 12 April 1808, granting permission to establish a small seminary in the abbey. However, this never came to fruition.

By virtue of the Treaties of Vienna and Paris in 1815, the County of Nice was returned to the King of Sardinia and all French laws were repealed and replaced by the pre-existing Sardinian legislation. After long negotiations between Pope Leo XII and King Charles Felix of Savoy, a concordat of 14 May 1828 restored all ecclesiastical property and revenues. The abbey of Saint Pons remained the exclusive property of the State but was required to be devoted to worship. Following extensive renovations, the bishop of Nice, Monseigneur Galvano, installed the Oblates of Mary Immaculate of Pignerole in the abbey. A Sardinian law on 29 May 1855 suppressed several religious congregations including the Oblates of Mary, although they were allowed to remain at the abbey of Saint Pons as long as they lived.

In 1860 the Abbey of Saint Pons became the property of the French State. A law on 1 July 1901 led to the dissolution of the order of the Oblates and their evacuation from the monastery, with the exception of four monks protected by Sardinian law who remained as guardians of the monastery until their deaths. A decree of 14 December 1898 authorised the sale of the monastery of Saint Pons to the city of Nice for the sum of 60,000 francs. It was later transformed into an annex to the Hospital of Saint Roche under the name The Hospital of the Abbey. The church remained under sequestration until its transformation into Saint Pons parish on 20 August 1914.

The abbey is now part of the Pasteur Hospital.

== Works cited ==
- Passet Claude, La Passion de Pons de Cimiez (Passio Pontii). Sources et tradition, Belisane, Nice, 1977, (ISBN 978-2-902296-05-7).
