= List of bishops of Grenoble =

A list of the bishops of the diocese of Grenoble was compiled by Bishop Hugues (1080–1132) in his cartulary, and carried forward until the mid-15th century.

The names, dates, and order of the bishops between c. 1230 and 1340 is the subject of confusion, in the sources and in the modern authorities. Barthélémy Hauréau, in 1860, cited an unpublished document dated 1310, written by Bishop Guillelmus, in which the bishop refers to his predecessors by name and order: Soffredus, Petrus, Falco, and Guillelmus. Hauréau concludes that the author, Bishop Guillelmus, is the immediate successor of the bishop Guillelmus mentioned in the text. Most authorities, therefore, are wrong in stating that there was a third bishop Guillelmus, who was in office in 1310, and in stating that there was an episcopal election in 1302.

== To 1000 ==
- 381–384 : Domninus
- : Diogenus
- : Amicus
- 420 : Sebastianus
- 439–? : Vitalianus
- 441–459 : Ceretius
- 464 : Viventius
- 517–518 : Victurius
- 538 : Ursolus
- 552–570 : Syagrius (I)
- 573–601/608 : Hesychius
- 614–626 : Syagrius (II)
- 650 : Clarus
- 653 : Ferreolus
- 664 : Boso
- 690 : Hesychius (II)
- 699 : Austrobertus
- 707 : Ramnoldus
- 726 : Ragnomarus
- 742 : Austoricus
- 743–? : Corbus
- 760 : Leopertus
- 804 : Adalhard
- 825 : Radoldus
- 829 : Supertus
- – : Evrardus
- 840 : Adalulfus
- 855–860 : Ebbo
- 869–? : Bernarius
- 888–922 : Isaac
- 944–949 : Alcherius
- 949–990 : Isarnus
- 990–1025 : Humbert I. d`Albon

== From 1000 to 1500 ==
- 1025–1035 : Mallenus
- 1036–1058 : Artaldus
- 1058–10?? : Pontius Claudus
- 1070–1076 : Pontius
- 1080–1132 : Hugh of Châteauneuf
- 1132–1148 : Hugues
- 1148–1150 : Natalis
- 1150–1151 : Othmar de Sassenage
- 1151–1163 : Geoffroy
- 1164–1220 : Jean de Sassenage
- 1220 : Guillelmus
- 1220–1223?: Pierre (I)
- 1223–1237 : Soffredus
- 1248–1250 : Petrus
- c.1250–1266 : Falco
- 1266– ? : Guillaume de Sassenage
- 1301–1337 : Guillaume
- 1337–1350 : Jean de Chissé
- 1350–1380 : Rodolphe de Chissé (Avignon Obedience)
- 1380–1388 : François de Conzié (Avignon Obedience)
- 1388–1427 : Aymon de Chissé O.S.B. (Avignon Obedience)
- 1427–1450 : Aymon II de Chissé
- 1450–1476 : Siboud Alleman de Séchilienne
- 1476–1482 : Laurent Alleman de Laval
- 1482–1484 : Jost von Silenen
- 1484–1518 : Laurent Alleman de Laval

== From 1500 to 1802 ==
- 1518–1561 : Laurent Alleman II de Laval
- 1562–1575 : François d`Avançon O.S.B.
- 1575–1606 : François du Fléard
- 1607–1619 : Jean de La Croix de Chevrières
- 1619–1620 : Alphonse de La Croix de Chevrières
- 1620–1668 : Pierre Scarron
- 1671–1707 : Étienne Le Camus
- 1708–1719 : Ennemond Allemand de Montmartin
- 1721–1725 : Paul de Chaulnes
- 1726–1771 : Jean de Caulet
- 1771–1779 : Jean de Cairol de Madaillan
- 1779–1788 : Hippolyte Haÿ de Bonteville
- 1789–1802 : Jean-Marie du Lau d'Allemans

== Constitutional Church ==
In 1790 the ancien régime and the system of dioceses were abolished by the French revolution. New dioceses were ordered by the National Assembly in the Civil Constitution of the Clergy of 12 July 1790, the diocese of Isère, in the Constitutional Church. Constitutional bishops were elected by special electors approved by the regime. Appeal or even reference to the pope was forbidden.

- 1791–1792 : Joseph Pouchot (constitutional bishop)
- 1792–1802 : Henri Reymond (constitutional bishop)

== Diocese of Grenoble, restored ==
In 1801 the diocese was restored by Pope Pius VII.

- 1802–1825 : Claude Simon
- 1826–1852 : Philibert de Bruillard
- 1853–1870 : Jacques-Marie-Achille Ginoulhiac
- 1870–1875 : Pierre-Antoine-Justin Paulinier
- 1875–1899 : Amand-Joseph Fava
- 1899–1911 : Paul-Émile Henry
- 1911–1916 : Louis-Joseph Maurin
- 1917–1957 : Alexandre Caillot
- 1957–1969 : André-Jacques Fougerat
- 1969–1989 : Gabriel-Marie-Joseph Matagrin
- 1989–2006 : Louis Jean Dufaux
- 2006–2021 : Guy de Kerimel
- 2022–present : Jean-Marc Eychenne

== Sources ==
- Bligny, Bernard (1979). Le Diocèse de Grenoble. (in French). Paris: Éditions Beauchesne; 1979. [Histoire des diocèses de France, 12].
- Dy Boys, Albert (1837). Vie de saint Hugues Eveque de Grenoble. (in French and Latin). Grenoble: Prud'homme, 1837.
- Duchesne, Louis (1907). Fastes épiscopaux de l'ancienne Gaule: Volume I. Provinces du Sud-Est. (in French). second edition. Paris: Fontemoing.
- Hauréau, Jean-Barthélemy (1865). Gallia christiana. (in Latin). vol. XVI, Paris 1865. (pp. 217–288; and "Instrumenta", pp. 73–100)
- Eubel, Conradus, ed. (1913). Hierarchia catholica (in Latin). Vol. 1 (Tomus I) (second ed.). Münster: Libreria Regensbergiana. (in Latin)
- Eubel, Conradus, ed. (1914). Hierarchia catholica (in Latin). Vol. 2 (Tomus II) (second ed.). Münster: Libreria Regensbergiana. archived
- Eubel, Conradus; Gulik, Guilelmus, eds. (1923). Hierarchia catholica (in Latin). Vol. 3 (Tomus III) (second ed.). Münster: Libreria Regensbergiana.
- Gauchat, Patritius (Patrice) (1935). Hierarchia catholica. Vol. 4 (Tomus IV) (1592–1667). Münster: Libraria Regensbergiana.
- Le Camus, Étienne (1868), Ulysse Chevalier. Catalogue des évêques de Grenoble. (in French). Grenoble: Imp. de Prudhomme, 1868.
- Maignien, Edmond (1880). Notes chronologico-historiques sur l'Évêché de Grenoble de 1151 à 1237. (in French). Grenoble: Prudhomme 1870.
- Prudhomme, Auguste (1888). Histoire de Grenoble. (in French). Grenoble: A. Gratier, 1888.
- Ritzler, Remigius; Sefrin, Pirminus (1952). Hierarchia catholica medii et recentis aevi. Vol. 5 (Tomus V) (1667–1730). Patavii: Messagero di S. Antonio.
- Ritzler, Remigius; Sefrin, Pirminus (1958). Hierarchia catholica medii et recentis aevi. Vol. 6 (Tomus VI) (1730–1799). Patavii: Messagero di S. Antonio.
- Ritzler, Remigius; Sefrin, Pirminus (1968). Hierarchia Catholica medii et recentioris aevi (in Latin). Vol. VII (1800–1846). Monasterii: Libreria Regensburgiana.
- Remigius Ritzler; Pirminus Sefrin (1978). Hierarchia catholica Medii et recentioris aevi (in Latin). Vol. VIII (1846–1903). Il Messaggero di S. Antonio.
- Pięta, Zenon (2002). Hierarchia catholica medii et recentioris aevi (in Latin). Vol. IX (1903–1922). Padua: Messagero di San Antonio. ISBN 978-88-250-1000-8.
