= Aymon de Chissé =

Aymon de Chissé was the name of two 15th-century bishops of Nice and Grenoble.

== Aymon I ==
Aymon I (died 1428) was the nephew of Ralph de Chissé, also bishop of Grenoble and later archbishop of Tarentaise. Aymon became bishop of Grenoble in 1388. As bishop and art lover he built the sanctuary of the cathedral mausoleum with its Gothic sculptures.

During his episcopate, the first public clock in Grenoble was commissioned (23 June 1398) and set in the steeple of the Collegiate Church of Saint-André, Grenoble, In 1424, he had built the Notre-Dame Hospital in the Rue Chenoise, Grenoble.

In 1427 he exchanged bishoprics with his nephew Aymon II, bishop of Nice, and died the following year.

== Aymon II ==
Aymon II (d. 1450) was the nephew of Aymon I and was likewise bishop of Nice and Grenoble.

He was Provost of the Collegiate Church of Saint-André, Grenoble until becoming bishop of Nice in 1422. He exchanged his diocese with his uncle in 1427 to become his successor as bishop of Grenoble.

Aymon II attended the Council of Florence in 1431 where he was responsible for beginning the formalities of absence against Pope Eugene IV, who had refused the summons to address the council.

Aymon II died in 1450.
