= Austadius =

6th century French bishop

Austadius was a 6th-century bishop of the diocese of Nice.

He is recorded briefly in Gregory of Tours' writings, wherein Gregory records that when Saint Hospitius died, he prophesied his own death several days before and had asked for Austadius to prepare his burial. Austadius did this and interred Hospitius in the wall of the tower where the saint had lived.
