= Saint-Pons-de-Thomières Cathedral =

Cathedral in Hérault, France

Coordinates: 43°29′20″N 2°45′32″E

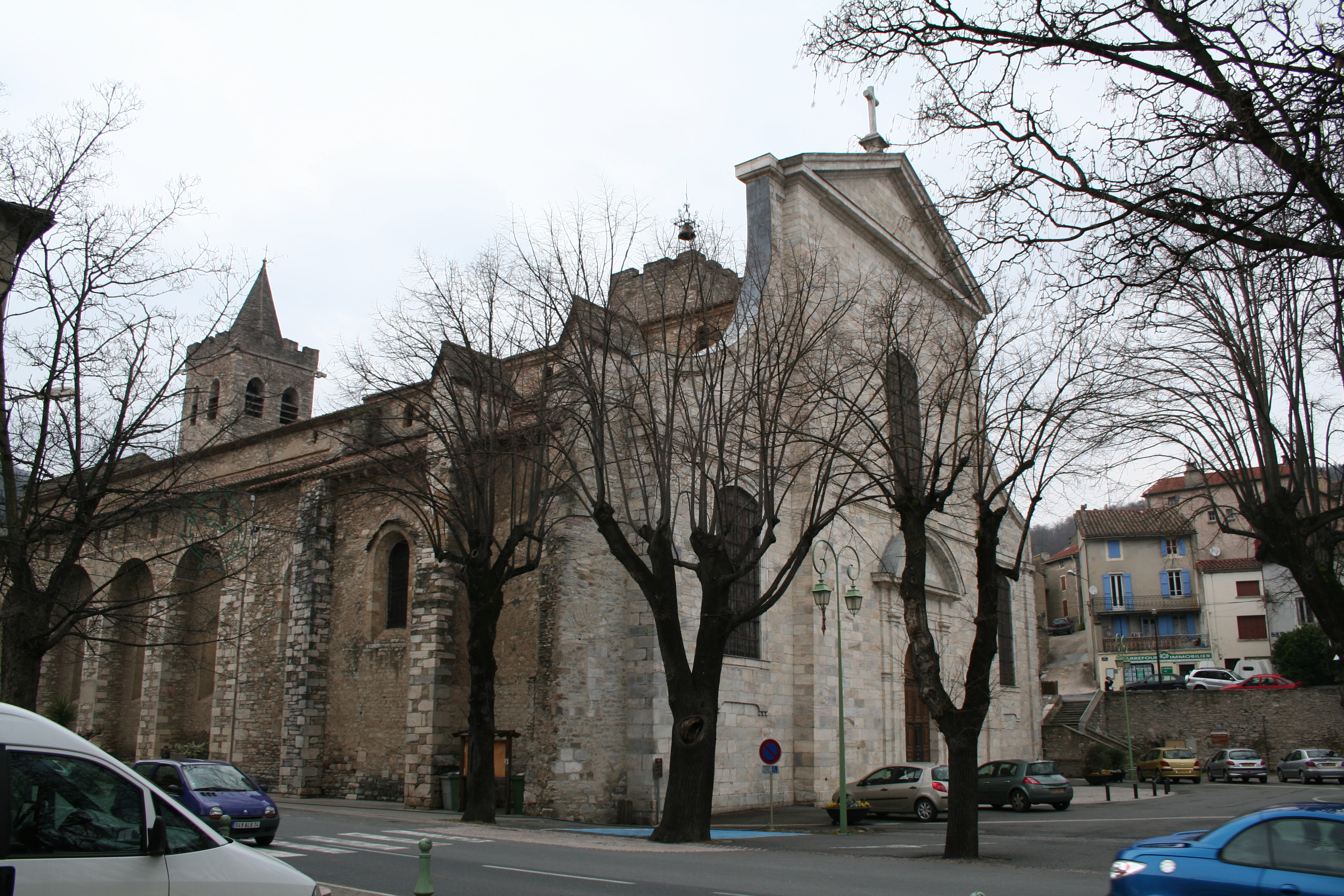
Saint-Pons-de-Thomières Cathedral from the south, showing the rebuilt east front

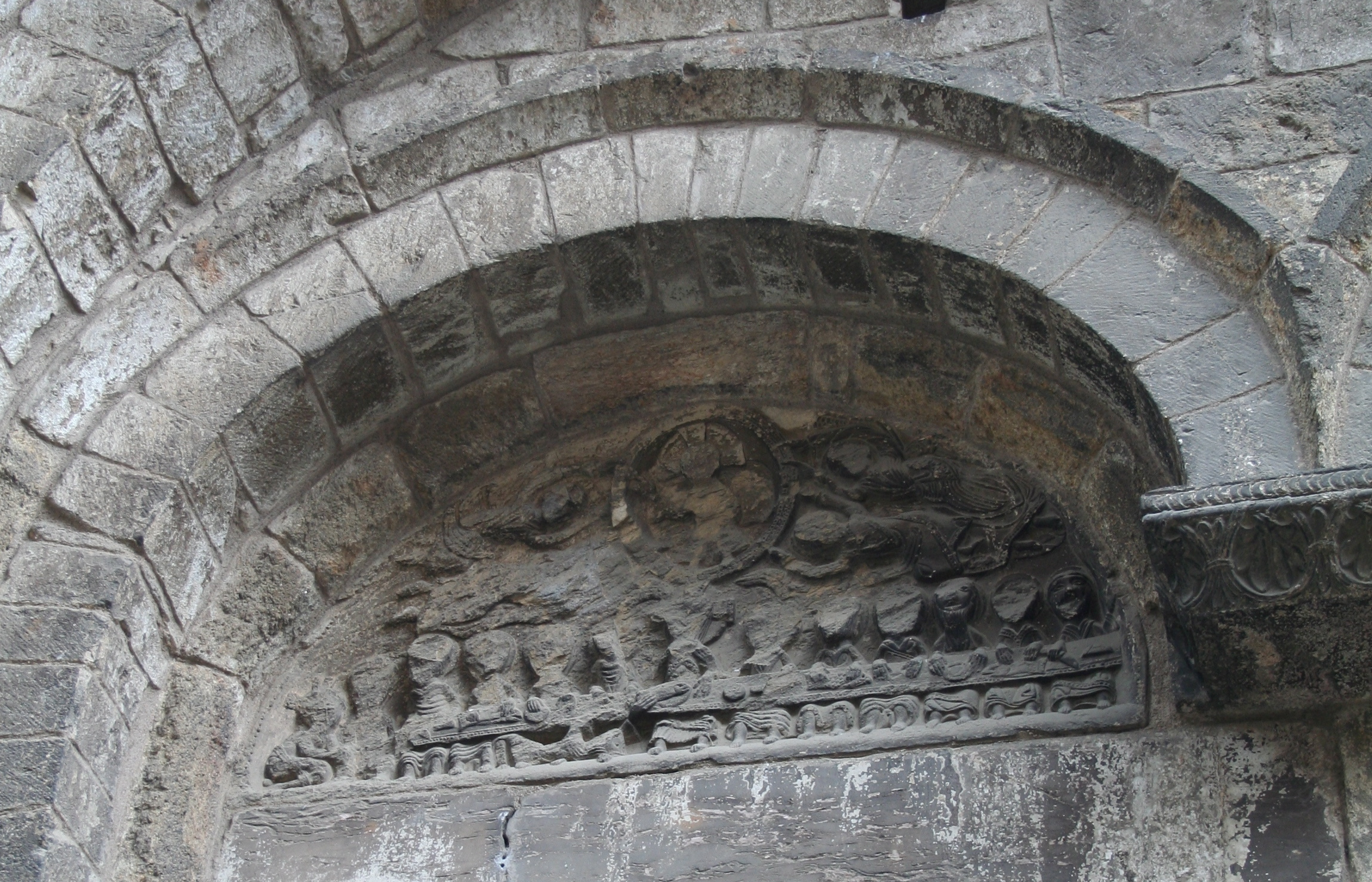
Portal, with carvings representing the Last Supper and the Ascension

Saint-Pons-de-Thomières Cathedral (Cathédrale Saint-Pons de Saint-Pons-de-Thomières) is a former Roman Catholic church located in Saint-Pons-de-Thomières, France. It is a national monument.

It was formerly the seat of the Bishopric of Saint-Pons, founded like a number of bishoprics in the region in the aftermath of the suppression of the Albigensians. By a Papal bull dated 18 February 1318, Pope John XXII created the see by elevating the abbey of Saint-Pons, which had been here since its foundation in 936 by Raymond, Count of Toulouse. The bishopric was abolished by the Concordat of 1801 and merged into the Diocese of Montpellier.

The Romanesque abbey church became the present cathedral. It takes its dedication, like the town and the abbey, from Saint Pontius of Cimiez. It is particularly known for the carvings on and around the portals. During the French Wars of Religion the choir was destroyed; it was replaced with the present neo-classical east front.
