= Dutherius =

Dutherius is a 3rd-century Early Church saint, martyr and bishop of Nice

His feast day is celebrated on 5 December.
