= Gerbold =

French bishop and saint

Saint Gerbold
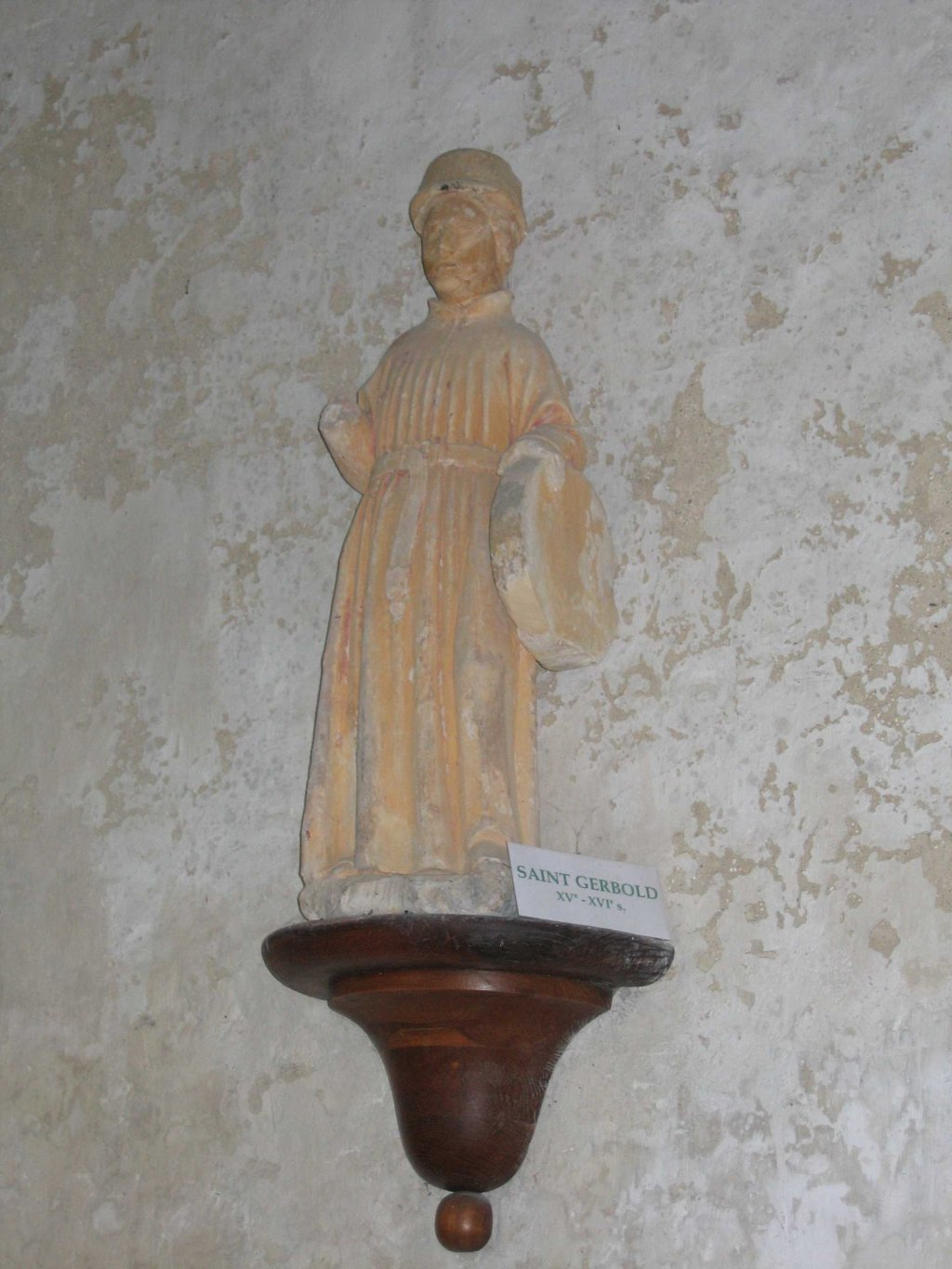
- Died: ~690 AD
- Venerated in: Roman Catholic Church
- Feast: December 7

Saint Gerbold (French: saint Gerbaud or saint Gerbold) (died c. 690 AD) was a French bishop venerated as a saint by the Catholic Church. He was a monk who founded the abbey of Livry in Normandy and later became bishop of Bayeux.

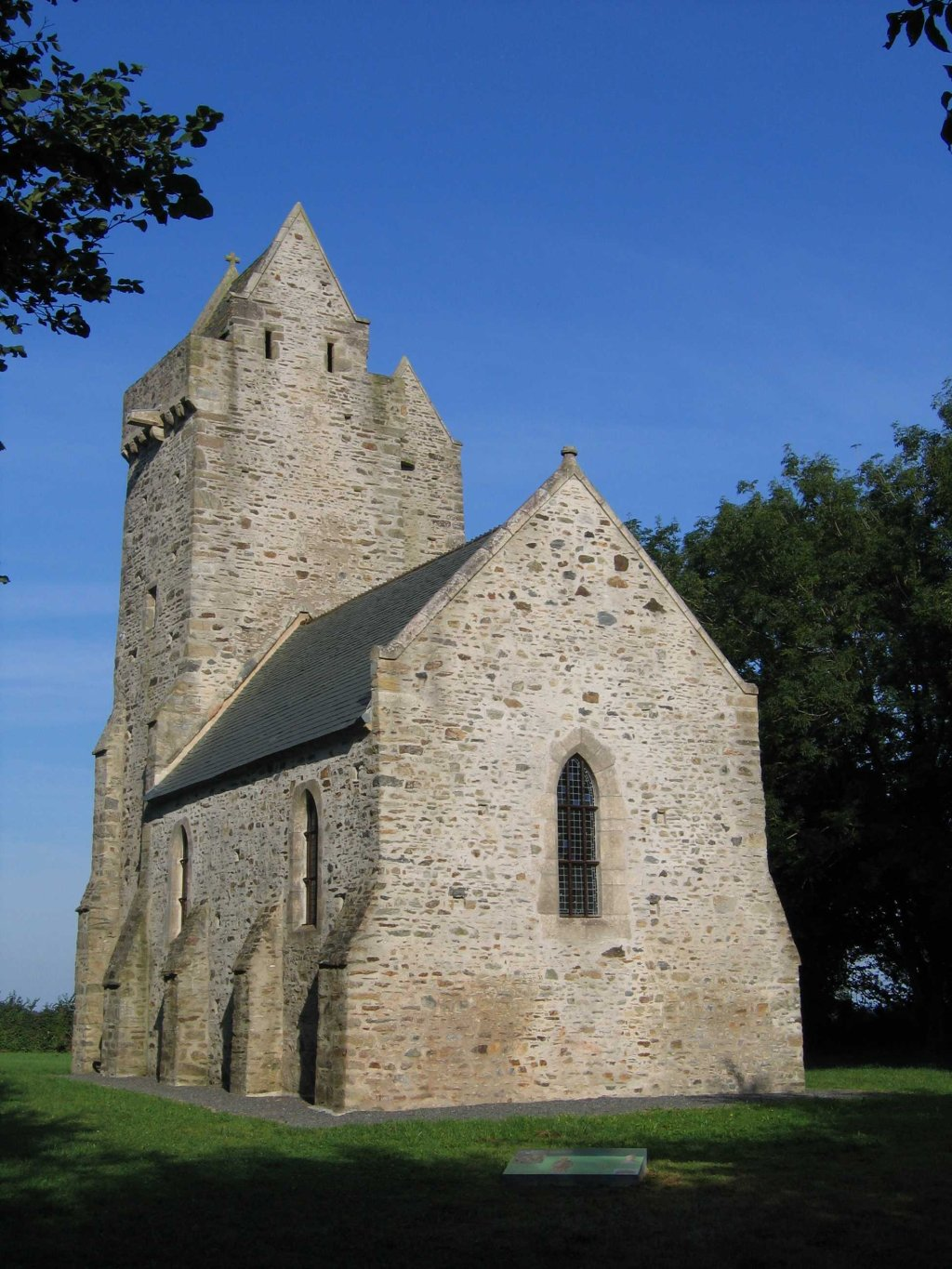
Hermitage of Saint Gerbold.
