= Bassus of Nice =

French bishop, Roman Catholic saint and martyr

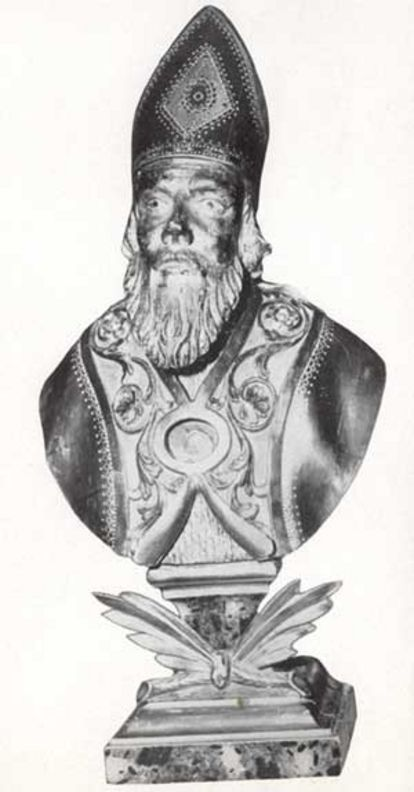
Bust of Saint Bassus

Saint Bassus of Nice (179 ca. – 250 AD) is a 3rd-century Roman Catholic saint and martyr, traditionally the earliest named bishop of Nice.

He was active on the Côte d'Azur, and was martyred for his faith under the Emperor Decius by being burned with red-hot blades and pierced from head to feet by two large shipbuilding nails, one through each foot.

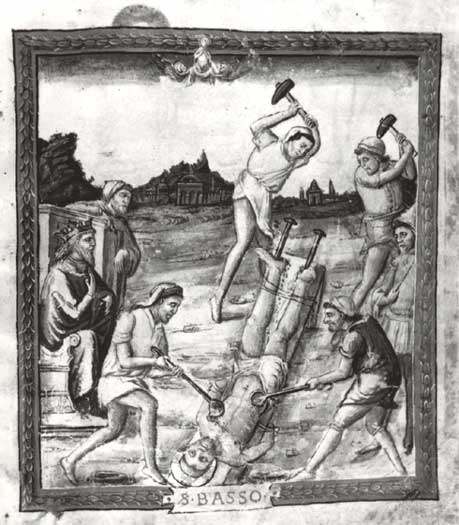
Martyrdom of Saint Bassus

He is venerated as a saint. His feast day is 5 December. He is the patron saint of Cupra Marittima in Italy, where his body was taken after his death, and since 1922 or 1923 the second patron saint of Nice.

== See also ==
- Decian persecution
