= Saint-Pons-de-Thomières =

- Commune
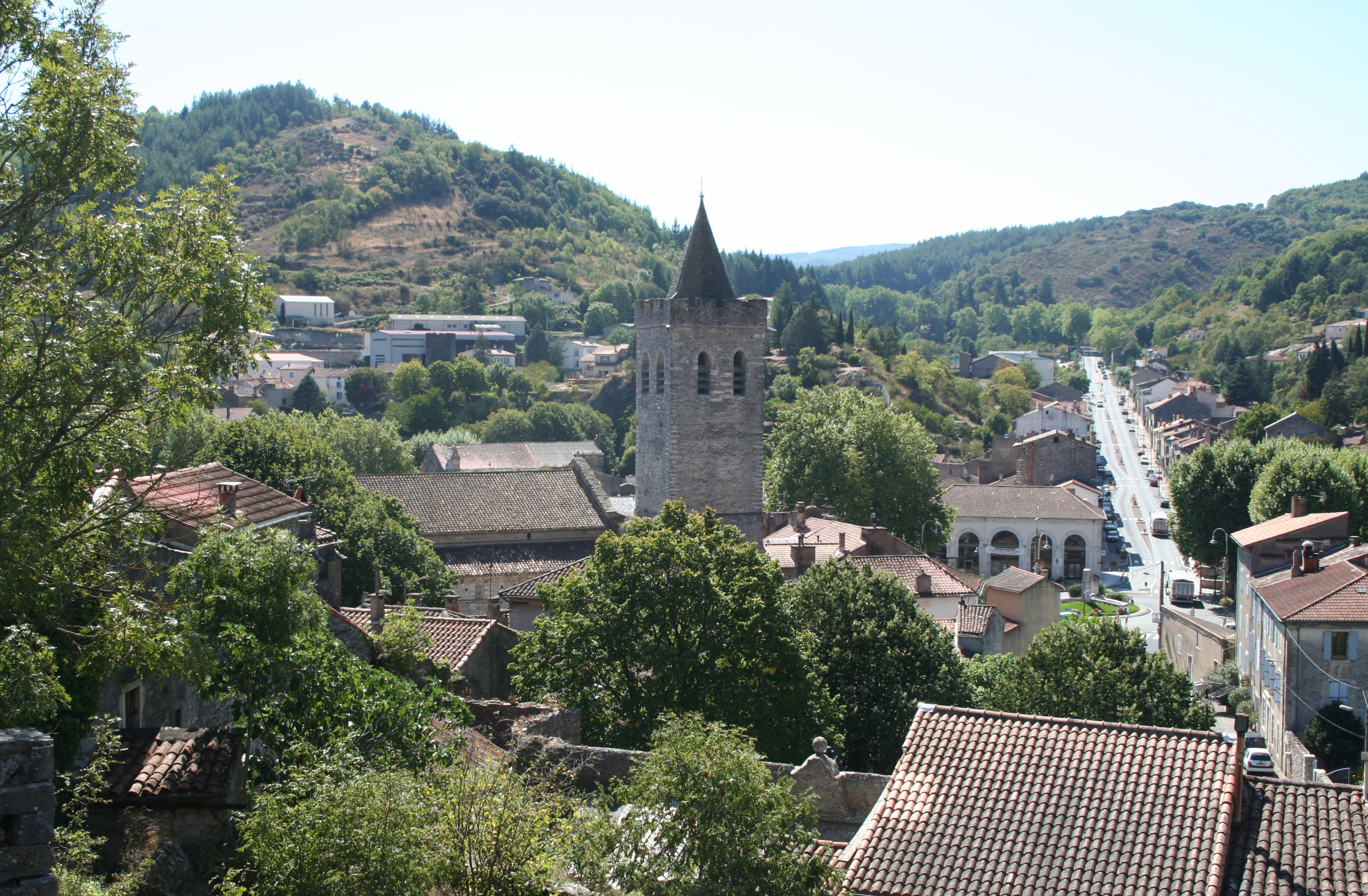
- A general view of Saint-Pons-de-Thomières

- Coat of arms
- Location of Saint-Pons-de-Thomières
- Location within France Location within Occitanie
- Coordinates: 43°29′22″N 2°45′39″E
- Country: France
- Region: Occitania
- Department: Hérault
- Arrondissement: Béziers
- Canton: Saint-Pons-de-Thomières

Government
  - Mayor (2020–2026): André Arrouche
- Area^{1}: 40.99 km^{2} (15.83 sq mi)
- Elevation: 301 m (988 ft)
- Highest elevation: 1,026 m (3,366 ft)
- Lowest elevation: 273 m (896 ft)
- Population (2023): 1,706
  - Density: 41.62/km^{2} (107.8/sq mi)
- Time zone: UTC+01:00 (CET)
  - Summer (DST): UTC+02:00 (CEST)
- INSEE/Postal code: 34284 /34220
- ^{1} French Land Register data, which excludes lakes, ponds, glaciers > 1 km^{2} (0.386 sq mi or 247 acres) and river estuaries.

Saint-Pons-de-Thomières (French pronunciation: [sɛ̃ pɔ̃s də tɔmjɛʁ]; Languedocien: Sant Ponç de Tomièiras) is a commune in the Hérault department in the Occitanie region in southern France.

== History ==
It is named after its patron saint, Saint Pontius of Cimiez (Pons de Cimiez in French), martyr under Emperor Valerian, who is venerated throughout the diocese of Montpellier.

The Abbey of St-Pons was founded in 936 by Raymond, Count of Toulouse, who brought to it the monks of Saint Gerald of Aurillac.

By a papal bull of 18 February 1318, Pope John XXII raised the abbey to an episcopal see.

A Brief of 16 June 1877 authorized the bishops of Montpellier to call themselves bishops of Montpellier, Béziers, Agde, Lodève, and Saint-Pons, in memory of the different dioceses united in the present Diocese of Montpellier.

== Population ==
Historical population
Year	Pop.	±% p.a.
1968	3,267	—
1975	3,117	−0.67%
1982	2,733	−1.86%
1990	2,566	−0.79%
1999	2,287	−1.27%
2007	2,161	−0.71%
2012	2,056	−0.99%
2017	1,885	−1.72%
2023	1,706	−1.65%
Source: INSEE

== See also ==
- Communes of the Hérault department
