= Pontius of Cimiez =

Roman saint and martyr (died c. 257)

Saint Pontius of Cimiez
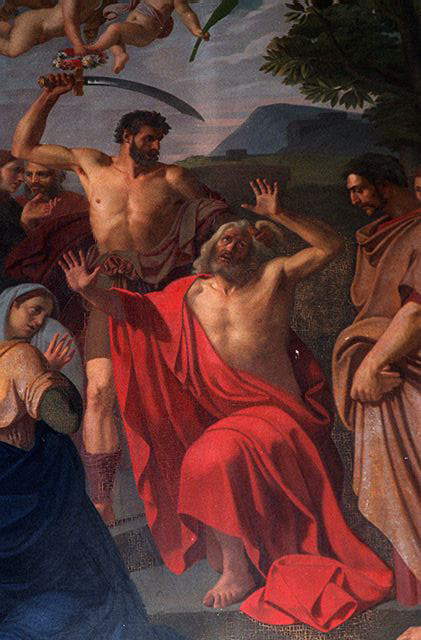
- "Martyrdom of Saint Pons": altarpiece by Joseph Castel (1798-1853) of Nice, displayed on the high altar in the church of the former Abbey of St Pons

Preacher and Martyr
- Born: 3rd century Rome, Italia, Roman Empire
- Died: 257; Cemenelum, Gaul, Roman Empire
- Venerated in: Roman Catholic Church; Eastern Orthodox Church; Oriental Orthodox Church
- Feast: 14 May
- Patronage: Herbalists, beekeepers, Catalonia

Pontius of Cimiez, also known as Pons of Cimiez (French: Pons de Cimiez, Ponce de Cimiez) was a Christian saint and martyr in third century Gaul.

His feast day is 14 May.

== Life ==
Born at Rome into a pagan family, Pontius converted to Christianity, giving away his property and preaching the Gospel. He is believed to have evangelized the valley of the Ubaye River.

He was martyred at Cemenelum (modern-day Cimiez, now part of Nice) in the south of France in the year 257 under the Emperor Valerian.

His name is preserved in the communes of Saint-Pons in the present department of Alpes-de-Haute-Provence, and of Saint-Pons-de-Thomières in the department of Hérault, where Saint-Pons-de-Thomières Cathedral is dedicated to him, as is the Abbey of St Pons in Nice, founded near the site of his martyrdom.

== Devotion to Catalonia ==
A local tradition explains that Pontius came to Barcelona and, seeing so much poverty and disease among the people, began to prepare potions with healing herbs. He earned the respect and admiration of the locals, who began to hold a fair of herbs in his honor. Saint Pontius (Catalan: Sant Ponç; Spanish: San Ponce) thus became patron of herbalists and beekeepers. In Catalonia, his feast day occurs on May 11, when revelers sell honey, aromatic and medicinal herbs and candied fruits.
