= Diocese of Nice =

Catholic diocese in France

Coordinates: 43°42′53″N 7°15′26″E

Diocese of Nice Dioecesis Nicensis Diocèse de Nice

Catholic
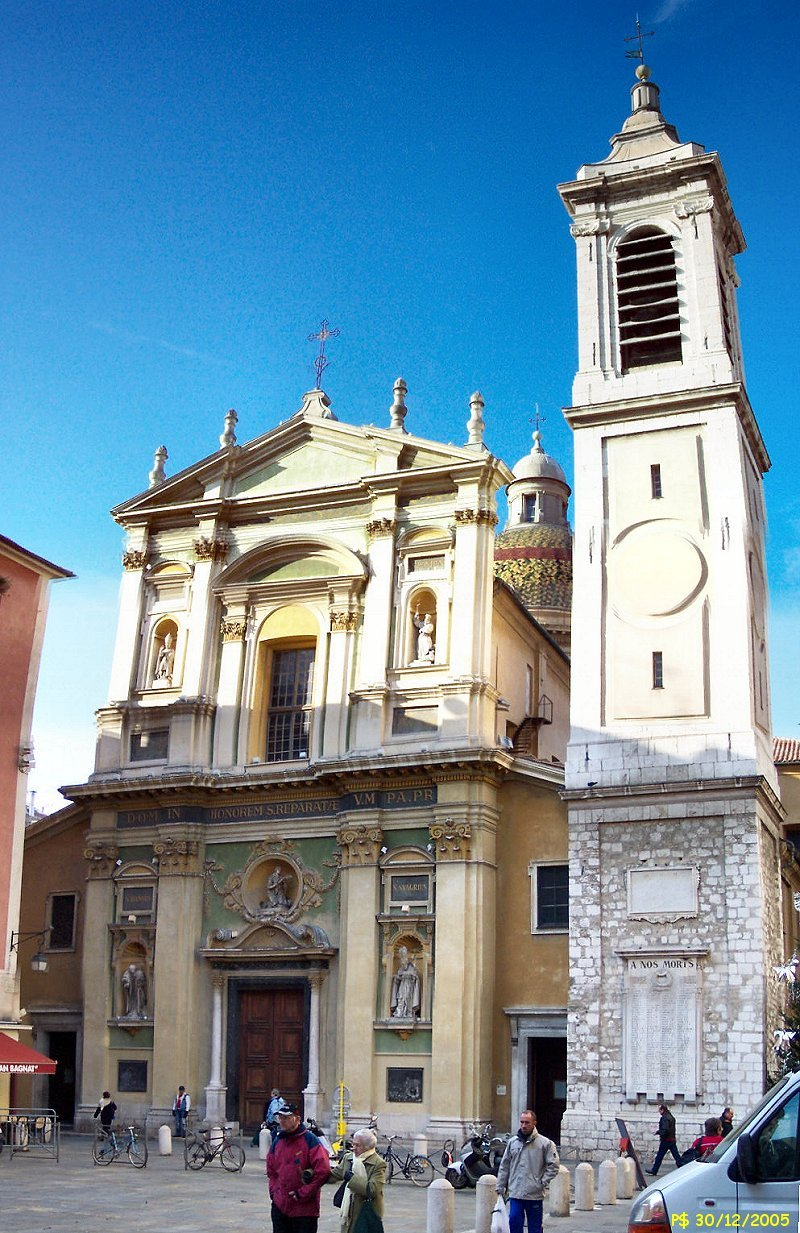
- Nice Cathedral

Location
- Country: France
- Ecclesiastical province: Marseille
- Metropolitan: Archdiocese of Marseille

Statistics
- Area: 4,283 km^{2} (1,654 sq mi)
- Population: Total; Catholics: (as of 2021); 1,098,550 (est.); 642,890 (guess)

Information
- Denomination: Catholic
- Sui iuris church: Latin Church
- Rite: Roman Rite
- Established: 3rd Century
- Cathedral: Cathedral Basilica of St. Mary and St. Reparata in Nice
- Patron saint: Saint Reparata
- Secular priests: 144 (diocesan); 50 (Religious Orders); 35 Permanent Deacons

Current leadership
- Pope: Leo XIV
- Bishop: Jean-Philippe Nault
- Metropolitan Archbishop: Jean-Marc Aveline
- Bishops emeritus: Louis Sankalé; Jean Marie Louis Bonfils; André Marceau

Map

Website
- nice.cef.fr

The Diocese of Nice (Latin: Dioecesis Nicensis; French: Diocèse de Nice) is a Latin diocese of the Catholic Church in France. The diocese comprises the Department of Alpes-Maritimes. The diocese is a suffragan of the Archdiocese of Marseille.

== History ==
=== Earliest Times ===
According to local tradition, Nice was evangelized by St. Barnabas, who had been sent by St. Paul, or else by St. Mary Magdalen, St. Martha, and St. Lazarus (who had been raised from the dead by Christ himself).

St. Bassus, a martyr under Emperor Decius (249–251), is believed by some to have been the first Bishop of Nice. There is some evidence of an organized see of Nice existing in the year 314 A.D. in Roman Gallia Narbonensis, since the deacon Innocent and the exorcist Agapitus, clerics from Nice, attended the Council of Arles that year, possibly as delegates of the bishop. Louis Duchesne, however, pointed out that Nice was not a city (civitas) and did not have its own municipal administration. It was governed from the city of Marseille by a civic functionary called an episcopus ('overseer'). In 314, this situation still obtained, and the delegates sent to the Council of Nicaea are described as coming from the portus of Nice, not the civitas. It might be presumed, therefore, that they represented the chief civic administrator, the episcopus from Marseille. Hence in Duchesne's view, there was not yet an ecclesiastical superior in Nice called an episcopus.

The first Bishop of Nice known by name is Amantius, who attended in person the Council of Aquileia in 381, as did also the bishop of Marseilles. Duchesne considers Amantius the first known bishop, rather than Bassus.

Cimiez, a civitas near Nice, but in the province of Alpes Maritimae and indeed its largest town, is claimed to have had an episcopal see around 260, which may be the case, even though the early history of Christianity in Cimiez is probably fictitious. At any rate, the see was occupied in the mid-fifth century by St. Valerian, who was present at Church councils between 439 and 451. A rescript of Pope Leo I (440–461), issued after AD 450, joined the two dioceses of Nice and Cimiez into one. This union was later reversed by Pope Hilarius, but in 465 he reunited them at the demand of Bishop Ingenuus of Embrun, the Metropolitan of the Alpes Maritimae, who was quarreling with Bishop Auxanius. in this later document Pope Hilarius' letter terms Cimiez a civitas and Nice a castellum and this episode has been interpreted as an attempt by Bishop Auxanius, who would have been Bishop of Marseille, to assert his see's control over Nice, for which he had consecrated a bishop.

During his rise to power, Charlemagne had visited Rome in 754, and had been made Patrician of the Romans by Pope Adrian I. It is claimed that when Charlemagne happened to visit Cimiez (which had been devastated by the Lombards in 574), he caused one Bishop Syagrius of Nice to build on the ruins the monastery of Saint Pontius of Cimiez. This claim presents major difficulties. There is only one source that mentions Syagrius, the Life written in the early seventeenth century by the hagiographer Vincenzo Barrali Salerna (fl. 1577–1613), a monk of Lerins, who states that Syagrius was Charlemagne's own nepos (paternal nephew), the Count of Brie; he found a place where the body of Saint Pons was being venerated, and got Charlemagne to build a monastery thanks to his repeated requests. Pope Adrian, in 777, his fifth year as pope, is said to have called Syagrius from his monastery and made him the first Bishop of Nice, an office he is said to have held for the last ten years of his life. By this account, Syagrius died on 23 May 787 and was buried in the abbey where he had been the first abbot. The problems begin with the brother of Charlemagne, Carloman, who was born in 751, making it most unlikely that his son Syagrius was made a bishop only twenty-six years later. Charlemagne's presence in Nice was motivated (Barrali Salerna says) by a desire to convert pagans in the area, during which he defeated the King of Chimaera (Chimeriensis). However, in reality there were no kings in the area, and most of the local people were Christians, as they had been for centuries. The claim that Charlemagne named Syagrius and his monastery Count of Cimiez, contradicts the fact that neither counts nor counties existed at that period. Nor was there ever a city of Chimaera, and the invention of its name seems to have been an erudite witticism, playing on mythological stories of fire-breathing monsters.

=== In the Second Millennium ===
The Bishops of Nice bore the title of Counts of Drap, since the donation of property situated at Drap made in 1073 by Pierre, Bishop of Vaison, a native of Nice, to Bishop Raymond I and his successors. In 1388 Nice fell under the political control of the Counts of Savoy, and Nice became the seat of a Seneschal. The Count (then Duke, then King of Sardinia) had the right to nominate a new bishop.

On 29 March 1137 Innocent II issued a bull, Officii nostri, confirming the privileges of the Church of Nice, including the castrum quod vocatur Drapum, for Bishop Petrus.

On 19 January 1183, Pope Lucius III wrote to Bishop Petrus, complaining about the degraded state of spiritual life in the monastery of S. Pons in Nice, and authorizing the bishop to take measures to repair the situation. Despite an agreement between the bishop and the monks in 1184, the latter remained unrepentant, and were excommunicated. They complained to Pope Lucius, who sent another letter on 31 March 1185, rebuking them and supporting the bishop.

In 1207 another scandal struck the diocese of Nice. Bishop Joannes was embroiled in another conflict with some religious of the diocese, and had concluded that certain documents presented by the religious were forged. They complained to Pope Innocent III, who issued a mandate to the Bishop of Glandèves and the Bishop of Sénez, to investigate the documents in question and the truth of the contents, so that the Pope would know how to proceed. Before that could happen, Bishop Joannes inspected the documents again and concluded that he had been wrong in the first place; he immediately approached Pietro di Castronovo, the Apostolic legate, and explained why he had made his mistake. But it was still a false charge of forgery. Canon law on falsifications, however, was clear and precise, and the bishop went directly to the Pope, who suspended him from office and appointed commissioners, Bishop Hugh of Riez and the Abbot of Boscaud, to convince the bishop to purge himself of his offense, and then restore him to office.

In 1691 Nice was seized by Louis XIV, though it was restored to Savoy in 1696. It was seized again by the Duke of Berwick in 1705, and restored to Savoy by the Treaty of Utrecht in 1713. It was attacked by the French again in 1744, and in 1792; it was united to France in 1793 and became the capital of the new Department of Alpes Maritimes.

The diocese was re-established by the Concordat of 1801 as a suffragan of Aix-en-Provence. While the Countship of Nice from 1818 to 1860 was politically part of the Sardinian States, the see became a suffragan of Genoa. When Nice was annexed to France in 1860, certain outlying districts which remained Italian were separated from the diocese and added to the Diocese of Ventimiglia. In 1862 the diocese again became a suffragan of Aix-en-Provence. The arrondissement of Grasse was separated from the Diocese of Fréjus in 1886, and given to Nice, which thereafter united the three former dioceses of Nice, Grasse and Vence.

== Bishops of Nice ==
=== to 1000 ===
? Bassus

- ? unnamed bishop, who sent delegates to Council of Arles (314).
- Amantius (381–439)

[Valerianus (439–455)], Bishop of Cimiez
Valerius
[Auxanius (462–466)]
Dutherius

- Magnus (549–581)
- Austadius (c. 581)
- Catulinus (585–614)
- Abraham (614–?)

...
Syagrius ([777–788])

- Johannes (788–791)

...

- Frodonius (c. 999)

=== 1000 to 1300 ===
- Bernard (1004?–?)
- Pons (1011–1030)
- André (I) (1033–1034)
- Nitard (1037–1040)
- André (II) (1042–1051)
- Raimond (I) (1064–1074)
- Archimbaud (1074–1078)
- Anselm (1100–07)
- Isnard (1108–1114)
- Pierre (1115–1149)
- Arnaud (1151–1164)
- Raimond Laugier (c. 1166)
- Pierre (c. 1183–1191?)
- Jean (1200–1207)
- Henri (1208–1236)
- Mainfroi (1238–1246)
- Nitard (1247–1251)
- Morardus (c. 1251– ? )
- Pierre (II) (1257–1272)
- Hugues (1285–1292)
- Bernard Chabaud de Tourettes (1294–1302?)

=== Bishops during the Avignon Papacy ===
- Nitard (c. 1301–c. 1311)
- Raimond, O.E.S.A. (?–1316)
- Guillaume, O.Min. (1317–1323)
- Rostaing, O.P. (1323–1329)
- Jean Artaud, O.P. (1329–1334)
- Raymond, O.Min. (1334–1335)
- Guillaume (1335 – 1348?)
- Pierre Sardina (1348–1360)
- Laurent Le Peintre (1360–1365)
- (Pierre) Roquesalve de Soliers, O.P. (1371–1380)

=== Bishops during the Great Western Schism ===
- Jean de Tournefort (1382–1400) (Avignon Obedience)
- Damiano Zavaglia, O.P. (1385 – 1388.06) (Roman Obedience)
- François (1403–1409) (Avignon Obedience)
- Jean de Burle (1409–1418) (Avignon Obedience)

=== Bishops, 1418 to 1800 ===
- Antoine Clément, O.Min. (1418–1422)
- Aimon de Chissé (1422–1427)
- Aimond de Chissé (1427–1428)
- Louis Badat (1428–1444)
- Aimon Provana de Leyni, O.S.B. (1446–1461)
- Henri de Albertis (1461–1462)
- Barthélemi Chuet (1462–1501)
- Jean de Loriol (1501–1506)
- Agostino Ferrero, O.Cist. (1506 – 16 September 1511) (Apostolic Administrator)
- Girolamo de' Capitani d'Arsago, O.S.B. (1511–1542)
- Girolamo Recanati Capodiferro (6 Feb 1542 Appointed – 30 July 1544)
- François de Lambert (1549 – 1582)
- Jean Louis Pallavicino Ceva (7 Nov 1583 – 5 November 1598)
- Francesco Martinengo, O.Min.Obs. (23 Oct 1600 Appointed – 22 August 1620)
- Pierre François Maletti, (10 Jan 1622 Appointed – 4 December 1631)
- Giacomo Marenco (17 Dec 1634 Appointed – 2 January 1644)
- Didier Palleti, (28 Nov 1644 Appointed – 18 September 1658)
- Giacinto Solaro di Moretta (9 Jun 1659 – 23 April 1663)
- Diego della Chiesa (6 Jul 1665 – 30 December 1669)
- Henri Provana, O.Carm.Discalc. (23 Feb 1671 – 30 November 1706)

Sede Vacante

- Raymond Recrosio, Cong. Barn. (30 Jul 1727 Confirmed – 21 May 1732)
- Charles-François Cantoni (Couton) (17 Apr 1741 – 23 August 1763)
- Jacques-Thomas Astesan, O.P. (9 Jul 1764 Confirmed – 1 June 1778)
- Charles-Eugène de Valperga de Maglione (20 Mar 1780 – Oct 1800)

=== Modern Bishops ===
- Jean-Baptiste Colonna d'Istria (11 Jul 1802 – 29 July 1833 Retired)
- Dominique Galvano (24 Nov 1833 Ordained – 17 August 1855 Died)

Sede Vacante (1855–1858)

- Jean-Pierre Sola (3 Jan 1858 – Oct 1877 Retired)
- Matthieu-Victor-Félicien Balaïn, (10 Mar 1878 – 3 September 1896)
- Henri-Louis Chapon (29 Sep 1896 Ordained – 14 December 1925 Died)
- Louis-Marie Ricard (22 Jun 1926 Installed – 21 October 1929 Died)
- Paul-Jules-Narcisse Rémond (8 Jul 1930 Installed – 24 April 1963 Died)
- Jean-Julien-Robert Mouisset (24 Apr 1963 Succeeded – 30 April 1984 Retired)
- François de Sales Marie Adrien Saint-Macary (30 Apr 1984 Succeeded – 14 November 1997)
- Jean Marie Louis Bonfils, S.M.A. (28 Aug 1998 Appointed – 28 March 2005 Retired)
- Louis Albert Joseph Roger Sankalé (28 Mar 2005 Succeeded – 8 August 2013 Resigned)
- André Marceau (6 Mar 2014 – 9 March 2022)
- Jean-Philippe Nault (9 March 2022 – present)

== See also ==
- Catholic Church in France
- County of Nice

== Sources ==
=== Reference Books ===
- Gams, Pius Bonifatius (1873). Series episcoporum Ecclesiae catholicae: quotquot innotuerunt a beato Petro apostolo. Ratisbon: Typis et Sumptibus Georgii Josephi Manz. pp. 582–584. (Use with caution; obsolete)
- Eubel, Conradus, ed. (1913). Hierarchia catholica, Tomus 1 (second ed.). Münster: Libreria Regensbergiana. (in Latin)
- Eubel, Conradus, ed. (1914). Hierarchia catholica, Tomus 2 (second ed.). Münster: Libreria Regensbergiana. (in Latin)
- Eubel, Conradus; Gulik, Guilelmus (1923). Hierarchia catholica, Tomus 3 (second ed.). Münster: Libreria Regensbergiana.
- Gauchat, Patritius (Patrice) (1935). Hierarchia catholica IV (1592-1667). Münster: Libraria Regensbergiana.
- Ritzler, Remigius; Sefrin, Pirminus (1952). Hierarchia catholica medii et recentis aevi V (1667-1730). Patavii: Messagero di S. Antonio.
- Ritzler, Remigius; Sefrin, Pirminus (1958). Hierarchia catholica medii et recentis aevi VI (1730-1799). Patavii: Messagero di S. Antonio.
- Ritzler, Remigius; Sefrin, Pirminus (1968). Hierarchia Catholica medii et recentioris aevi sive summorum pontificum, S. R. E. cardinalium, ecclesiarum antistitum series... A pontificatu Pii PP. VII (1800) usque ad pontificatum Gregorii PP. XVI (1846) (in Latin). Vol. VII. Monasterii: Libr. Regensburgiana.
- Remigius Ritzler; Pirminus Sefrin (1978). Hierarchia catholica Medii et recentioris aevi... A Pontificatu PII PP. IX (1846) usque ad Pontificatum Leonis PP. XIII (1903) (in Latin). Vol. VIII. Il Messaggero di S. Antonio.
- Pięta, Zenon (2002). Hierarchia catholica medii et recentioris aevi... A pontificatu Pii PP. X (1903) usque ad pontificatum Benedictii PP. XV (1922) (in Latin). Vol. IX. Padua: Messagero di San Antonio. ISBN 978-88-250-1000-8.

=== Studies ===
- Cais de Pierlas, E. (1903). Saige, Gustave (ed.). Chartrier de l'abbaye de Saint-Pons: hors les murs de Nice (in French and Latin). Impr. de Monaco.
- Cappelletti, Giuseppe (1857). Le chiese d'Italia della loro origine sino ai nostri giorni (in Italian). Vol. decimoterzo (13). Venezia: Giuseppe Antonelli. pp. 697–715.
- Duchesne, Louis (1907). Fastes épiscopaux de l'ancienne Gaule: I. Provinces du Sud-Est. Paris: Fontemoing. pp. 274–277. second edition (in French)
- Hildesheimer, Françoise; Bodard, Pierre (1984). Les Diocèses de Nice et Monaco (in French). Paris: Editions Beauchesne. ISBN 978-2-7010-1095-3.
- Pisani, Paul (1907). Répertoire biographique de l'épiscopat constitutionnel (1791-1802) (in French). Paris: A. Picard et fils.
- Sainte-Marthe (Sammarthani), Denis de (1725). Gallia Christiana: In Provincias Ecclesiasticas Distributa... Provinciae Cameracensis, Coloniensis, Ebredunensis (in Latin). Vol. Tomus tertius (III). Paris: Typographia Regia. pp. 1268–1302, Instrumenta, pp. 238–252.
- Salvetti, Bonaventure (1925). L'abbaye de Saint-Pons: hors les murs de Nice : essai historique (in French). Nice: Serre. ISBN 978-2-86410-398-1.
- Société bibliographique (France) (1907). L'épiscopat français depuis le Concordat jusqu'à la Séparation (1802-1905). Paris: Librairie des Saints-Pères. pp. 346–350.
- Stefani, Guglielmo (1854). Dizionario corografico-universale dell'Italia: 2.1: Dizionario corografico degli Stati sardi di terraferma (in Italian). Vol. secondo. Milano: G. Civelli. pp. 616–637. [list of bishops at pp. 635–637]
- Tisserand, Eugène François (1862). Histoire civile et religieuse de la Cité de Nice et du Département des Alpes-Maritimes: Chronique de Provence (in French). Vol. Premier volume. Nice: Visconti et Delbecchi.
- Tisserand, Eugène François (1862). Histoire civile et religieuse de la Cité de Nice et du Département des Alpes-Maritimes: Chronique de Provence (in French). Vol. second volume. Nice: Visconti et Delbecchi.
- Toselli, Jean Baptiste (1867). Précis historique de Nice, depuis sa fondation jusqu'en 1860 (in French). Vol. Premiere partie. Nice: C. Cauvin.

=== External links ===
- (in French) Centre national des Archives de l'Église de France, L'Épiscopat francais depuis 1919, retrieved: 2016-12-24.
- GCatholic.org- includes recent incumbents
- diocesan website, in French
