= Nice Cathedral =

Cathedral in Nice, France

Cathedral of Saint Reparata Cathédrale Sainte-Réparate
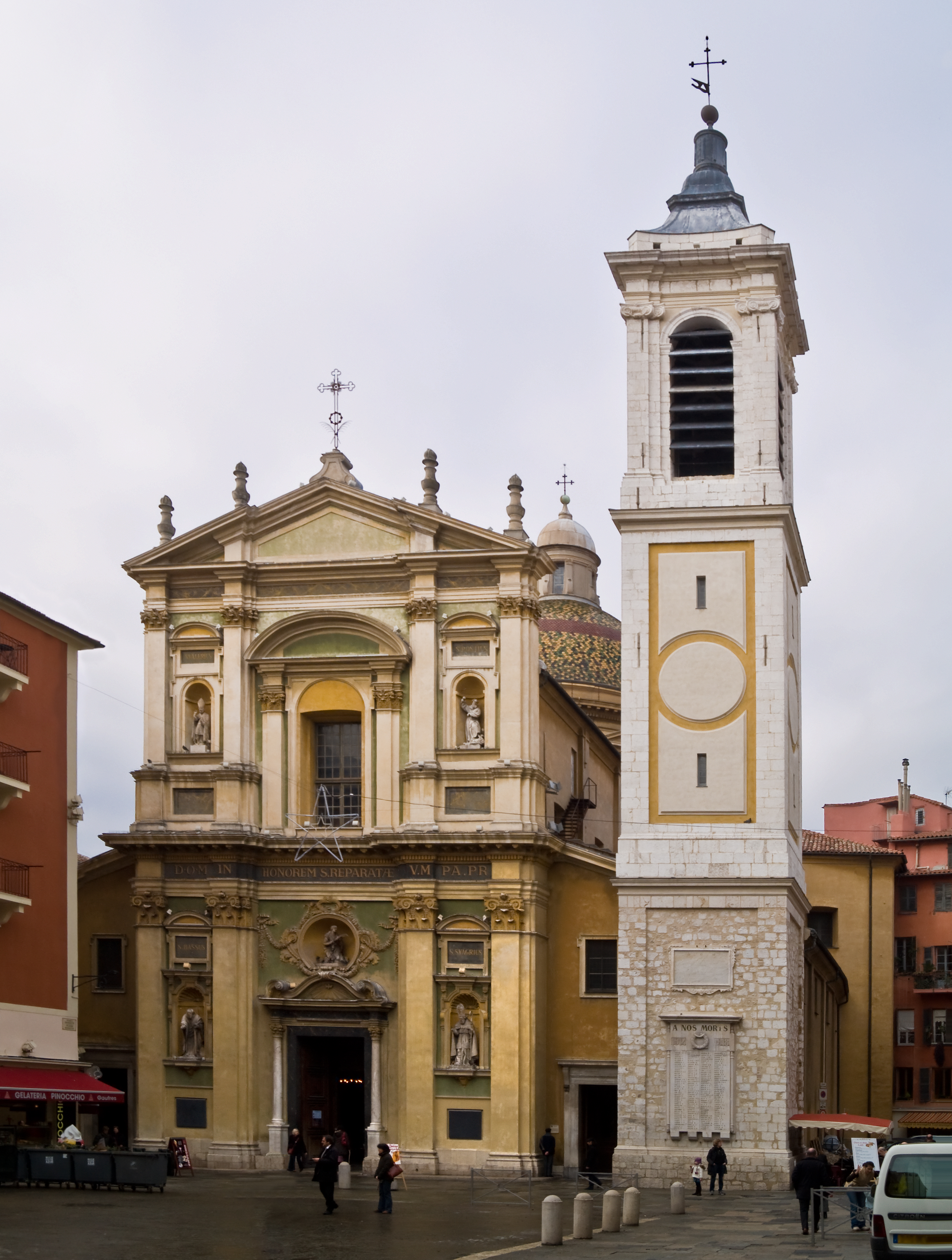
- Nice Cathedral

Religion
- Affiliation: Catholic Church
- Diocese: Diocese of Nice
- Rite: Latin
- Ecclesiastical or organizational status: Cathedral

Location
- Location: Nice, France
- Interactive map of Cathedral of Saint Reparata; Cathédrale Sainte-Réparate
- Coordinates: 43°41′50″N 7°16′33″E

Architecture
- Type: Church
- Style: Baroque
- Groundbreaking: 1650
- Completed: 1949

Nice Cathedral (French: Basilique-Cathédrale Sainte-Marie et Sainte-Réparate de Nice) is a Catholic cathedral located in the city of Nice in southern France.

The cathedral is the seat of the Diocese of Nice. The construction of the main part of the current cathedral's body started in 1650 and finished in 1685. Further construction continued after its consecration in 1699, with new structures and decorative elements added to the cathedral until 1949. The cathedral is dedicated to the Assumption of the Virgin Mary and Saint Reparata. It has been classified as a national monument since 9 August 1906.

== History ==
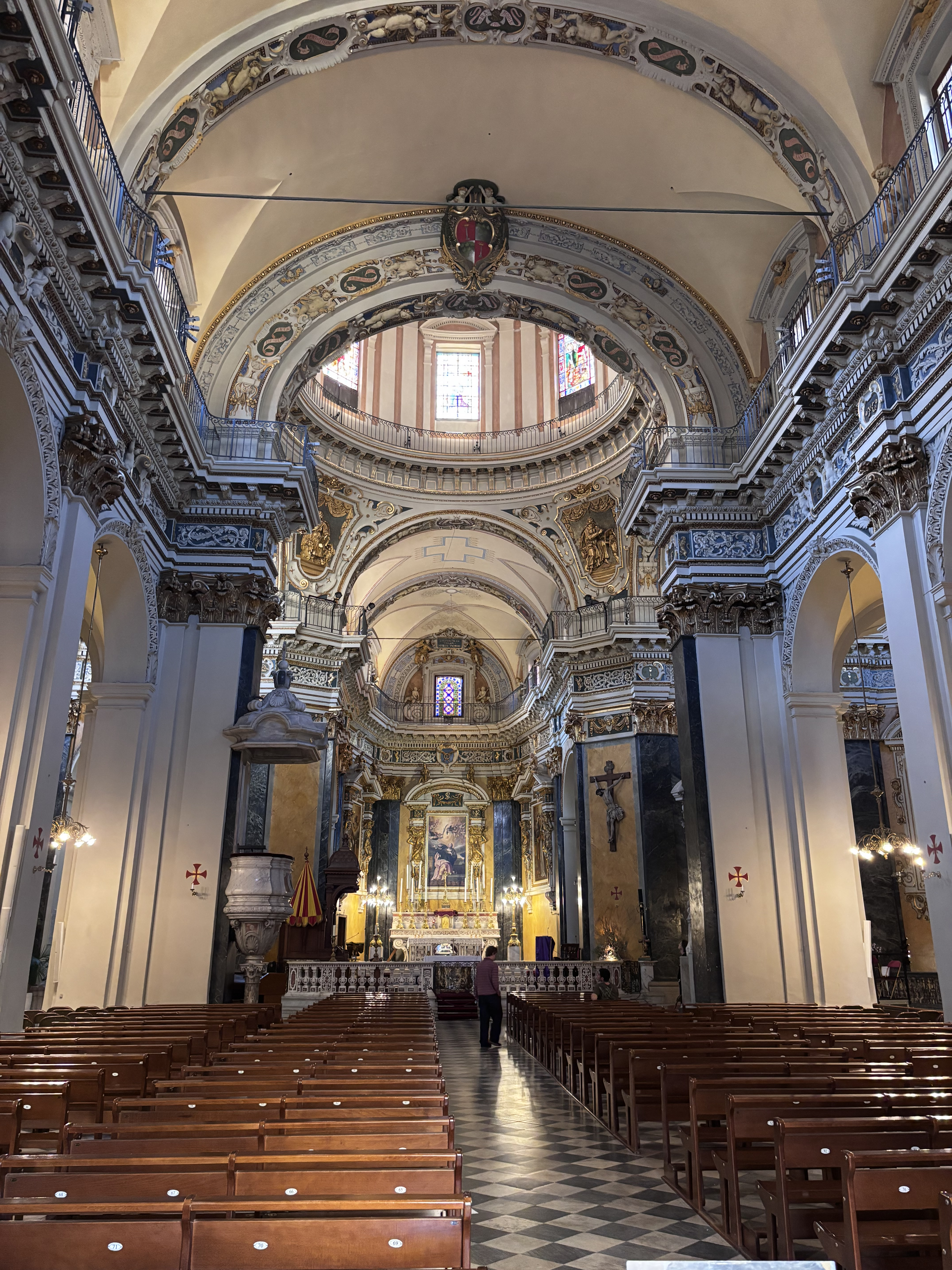
The interior of the Cathedral of Nice

The original cathedral on the site, called St Mary of the Castle, was consecrated in 1049. In 1060, relics belonging to Saint Reparata (for whom the current cathedral is named) arrived in Nice. By 1075, a chapel dedicated to St Reparata was constructed at the foot of the castle.

During the latter half of the 12th century, the chapel became a priory of the Abbey of Saint-Pons. 1246 marked the official establishment of the priory as a parish church. The first church on the site was built in the early 13th century on land belonging to the Abbey of St Pons and became a parish church in 1246.

Population growth led to extensions being built onto the church between 1455 and 1468. During the first half of the 16th century, a series of acts gradually effected the transfer of the seat of the bishops of Nice from Cimiez Cathedral, which sits on the hill of the castle overlooking the city, to the church of St Reparata in 1590. After an official ceremony presided over by the bishop Luigi Pallavicini, and in the presence of Charles Emmanuel I, Duke of Savoy, the church was recognized as a chiesa-cattedrale. In 1649, judging the building to be too small, Bishop Didier Palletis commissioned the architect Jean-André Guibert to produce a structure more in keeping with the importance of the city.

The construction of a new cathedral (the current main building) took place between 1650 and 1865. In 1699, the new cathedral was officially consecrated while additional construction continued.

The prominent bell tower was built next to it between 1731 and 1757.

The year 1900 marked the most recent addition to the cathedral, with the construction of new side chapels that replaced the former heavy baroque ornamentation. The cathedral was declared a minor basilica on 27 May 1949.

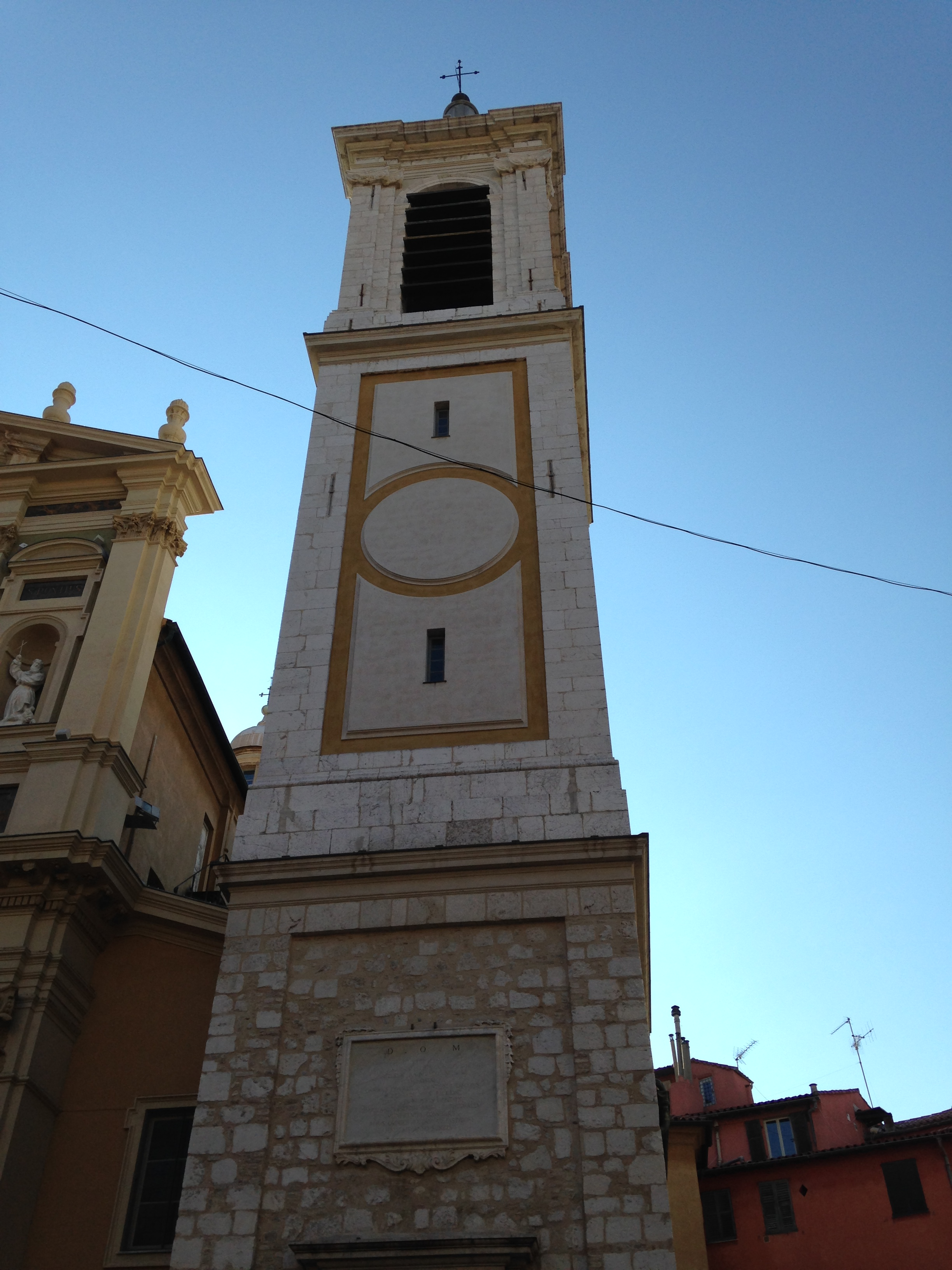
Bell tower of Nice Cathedral

== Description ==
=== Exterior ===
Originally rectangular and oriented to the North, the cathedral was rebuilt on the model of Santa Susanna in Rome, i.e. on a Latin cross ground plan oriented to the east, with a cupola, clad in coloured tiles varnished in the Genoese style, over the crossing. The building is in the Baroque architectural tradition.

A number of alterations have taken place since the initial construction. A campanile, which partially obscures the cupola, was built between 1731 and 1757. Between 1825 and 1830, a Baroque revival facade replaced the original west front. Between 1900 and 1903, an apse was added on either side of the choir.

=== Interior ===
The interior, also Baroque, includes ten chapels. The chapels are dedicated to Our Lady of the Seven Sorrows, the Crucifixion, Saint Rose of Lima, Saints Alexander and Bartholomew, the Holy Sacrament, Saint Rosalia and the Virgin, Saint Joseph, Saint Reparata, the Four Crowned Martyrs, and Saint John the Baptist. Until the end of the 17th century, each of the chapels was connected to a different guild, each of which bore the responsibility and expense of maintaining them. The high altar is surmounted by a picture of the Glory of Saint Reparata, the virgin martyr to whom the cathedral is dedicated and whose relics have been enshrined here since 1690.

=== Organs ===
The cathedral contains three organs: one is on a tribune above the narthex, another is in the north arm of the transept, and the third is in the choir rehearsal room.

== Sources and external links ==
- Ministry of Culture website: Nice Cathedral (in French)
- Monum.fr: Nice Cathedral (in French)
- Structurae.de: Nice Cathedral (in French)
- Nice Cathedral official website (in French)
- La Cathedrale Sainte-Reparate
