= Jean Mirailhet =

French painter

Jean Mirailhet or Miraillet, Miralhet, ca. 1394? – before 8 October 1457) was a French painter. He was presumably born in Montpellier, worked from about 1418 in Marseille and Nice, where he became a citizen in 1432, and died in Nice.

In 1400, Jean Mirailhet is the dean of the guild of painters and glaziers in Montpellier. It is not clear whether this is the same person, a relative, or an unrelated person.

Documents relating to Jean Mirailhet refer to three altar pieces that were ordered but are now lost, and in 1437 a banner for the guild of weavers of Aix-en-Provence. The three paintings are a 1432 altar piece with the "Annunciation of Saint Anthony and Saint Catherine" for the Marseille Cathedral, a 1440 work with the "Virgin and Child with Saint John the Baptist, Saint Honorius, and seven praying figures" for a merchant from Toulon, and a 1443 painting of "Saint Catherine with Saint Agnes and Saint Lucy" for a church in Marseille.

The only remaining work that is certainly by him is a large polyptych of 2.6 m by 2.19m, from the chapel of the black penitents in Nice. It is supposed to date to about 1425, shows the Virgin of Mercy, and is signed by Mirailhet on the right panel.
