= Jean-Marc Aveline =

French Catholic cardinal (born 1958)

His Eminence Jean-Marc Aveline
- Cardinal, Archbishop of Marseille
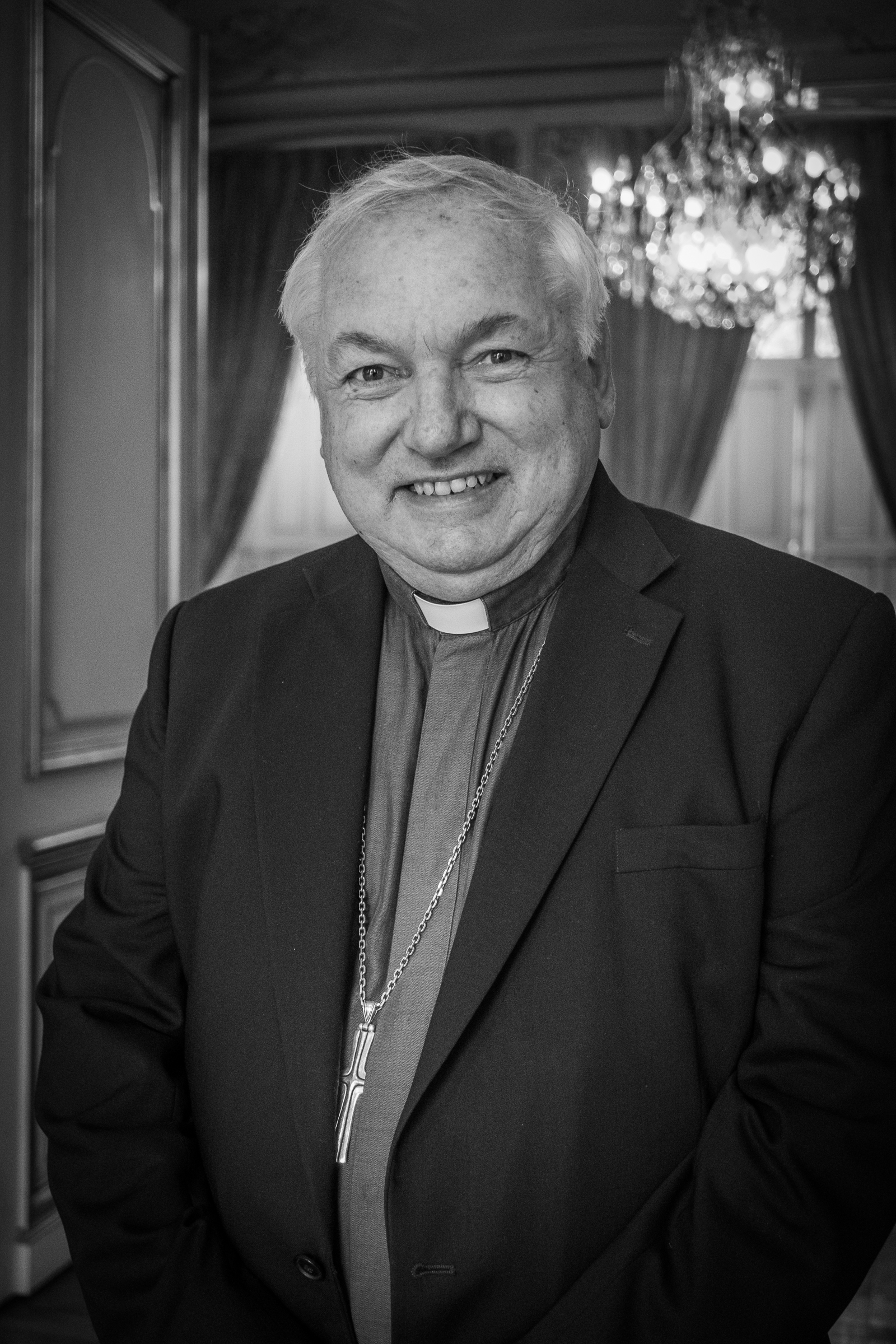
- Aveline in 2021
- Church: Roman Catholic Church
- Archdiocese: Marseille
- See: Marseille
- Appointed: 8 August 2019
- Installed: 15 September 2019
- Predecessor: Georges Pontier
- Other post: Cardinal Priest of Santa Maria ai Monti (2022–present)
- Previous posts: Titular Bishop of Simidicca (2013–2019); Auxiliary Bishop of Marseille (2013–2019)

Orders
- Ordination: 3 November 1984 by Louis Dufaux
- Consecration: 26 January 2014 by Georges Pontier
- Created cardinal: 27 August 2022 by Pope Francis
- Rank: Cardinal priest

Personal details
- Born: Jean-Marc Noël Aveline; 26 December 1958 (age 67) Sidi Bel Abbès, French Algeria
- Education: Catholic University of Paris; Sorbonne University
- Motto: Que tout se passe selon ta parole ("May it be done to me according to Your word")
- Coat of arms

Jean-Marc Noël Aveline (French pronunciation: [ʒɑ̃maʁk av(ə)lin]; born 26 December 1958) is a French Catholic prelate who has served as Archbishop of Marseille since 2019. He was previously an auxiliary bishop there from 2013 to 2019. Pope Francis made him a cardinal in 2022.

Aveline was named by several media outlets as papabile, meaning he was a possible candidate in the 2025 papal conclave.

== Biography ==
Jean-Marc Aveline was born on 26 December 1958 in Sidi Bel Abbes, in French Algeria. In 1966 his family moved to Marseille. His father was a railway worker and the family lived in SNCF housing in the Saint-Barthélemy neighborhood. He was educated in Marseille at Lycée Victor-Hugo and then for two years at Lycée Thiers. He studied at the inter-diocesan seminary of Avignon from 1977 to 1979. He then joined the Carmes Seminary of Paris to study at the Catholic University of Paris where he earned a doctorate in theology in 2000. He also earned a licenciate in philosophy at the Sorbonne.

He was ordained a priest of the Archdiocese of Marseille on 3 November 1984. He taught theology and taught at the seminary in Aix-en-Provence and performed parish work at the Saint-Marcel parish. Moving to the parish of Saint-Pierre and Saint Paul, he served as episcopal vicar for permanent formation from 1987 to 2007. He led the Archdiocese's vocation service from 1991 to 1996.

In 1992 he founded the Institut des sciences et de théologie des religions of Marseille (ISTR) and was its director for the next ten years. He was director from 1995 to 2013 of the Institut Saint-Jean, which in 1998 became the Catholic Institute of the Mediterranean and developed an association with the Faculty of Theology of Lyon. He also taught at the Faculty of Theology of the Catholic University of Lyon from 1997 to 2007. In 2007 he became vicar general of the Archdiocese of Marseille.

He was named to a five-year term as a consultant to the Pontifical Council for Interreligious Dialogue in 2007.

On 19 December 2013, Pope Francis named him Titular Bishop of Simidicca and Auxiliary Bishop of Marseille. He received his episcopal consecration on 26 January 2014 in the Marseille Cathedral from Georges Pontier, Archbishop of Marseille.

Within the Episcopal Conference of France he has headed the council for interreligious relations since 2017.

On 8 August 2019, Pope Francis named him Archbishop of Marseille. He was installed there on 15 September. On 13 July 2022, Pope Francis named him a member of the Dicastery for Bishops. On 27 August 2022, Pope Francis made him a Cardinal-Priest, assigning him the title of Santa Maria ai Monti.

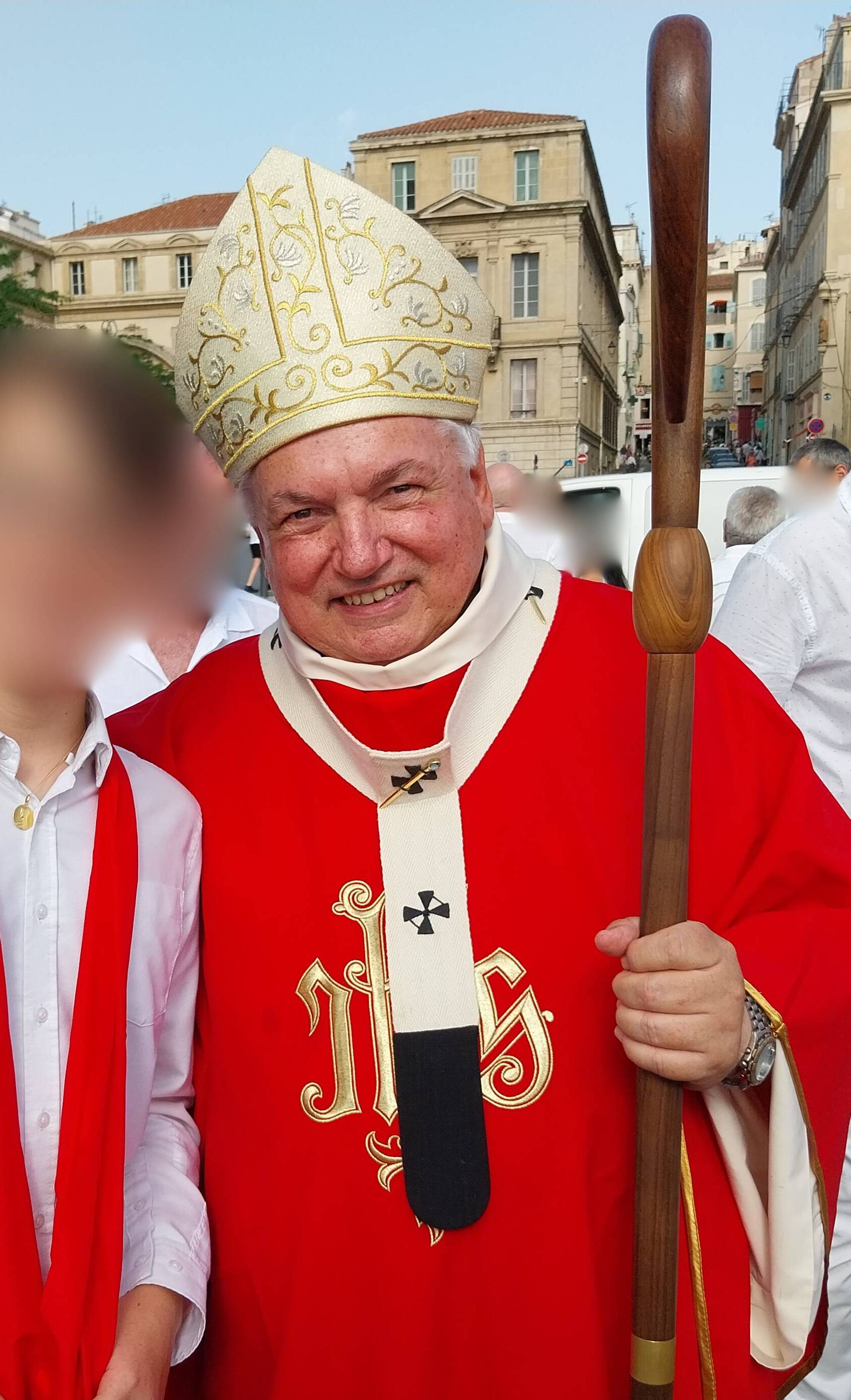
Aveline in 2025

On 17 September 2024, Pope Francis appointed Aveline as the Holy See’s special envoy for the Archdiocese of Quebec’s 350th anniversary celebrations on September 20–22. On 23 October 2024, the Synod of Bishops elected Aveline a member of the Ordinary Council of the General Secretariat of the Synod of Bishops.

In 2025, he was elected as the president of the Bishops' Conference of France, and succeeded Éric de Moulins-Beaufort. He was one of the cardinal electors that participated in the 2025 papal conclave that elected Robert Prevost as Pope Leo XIV. Several Vaticanists claimed that French President Emmanuel Macron "maneuvered" in order to promote and support Aveline's candidacy during the conclave.

Styles of Jean-Marc Aveline
- Reference style: His Eminence
- Spoken style: Your Eminence
- Religious style: Cardinal
- Informal style: Cardinal

== See also ==
- Cardinals created by Pope Francis
