= Abdalong of Marseilles =

French saint and bishop

Abdalong of Marseilles was a bishop of the Diocese of Marseille in the 8th century during the reign of Charles Martel. He has a popular cult without official recognition, which holds an informal feast day for him on March 1.
