= Charles Desmazures =

French baroque composer, and organist at the old Marseille Cathedral

Charles Desmazures (13 October 1669 – 13 February 1736) was a French baroque composer, and organist at the old Marseille Cathedral. He was born at Fère-en-Tardenois (Aisne). In 1701 he dedicated six Pièces de Simphonie (published 1702) to Maria Luisa of Savoy. He died at Marseille, aged 66.

French baroque choir Les Festes d'Orphée has published some works in the CD collection "Les Maîtres Baroques de Provence"
