= Archdiocese of Marseille =

Latin Catholic archdiocese in France

Coordinates: 43°17′12″N 5°22′12″E

Archdiocese of Marseille Archidioecesis Massiliensis Archidiocèse de Marseille

Catholic
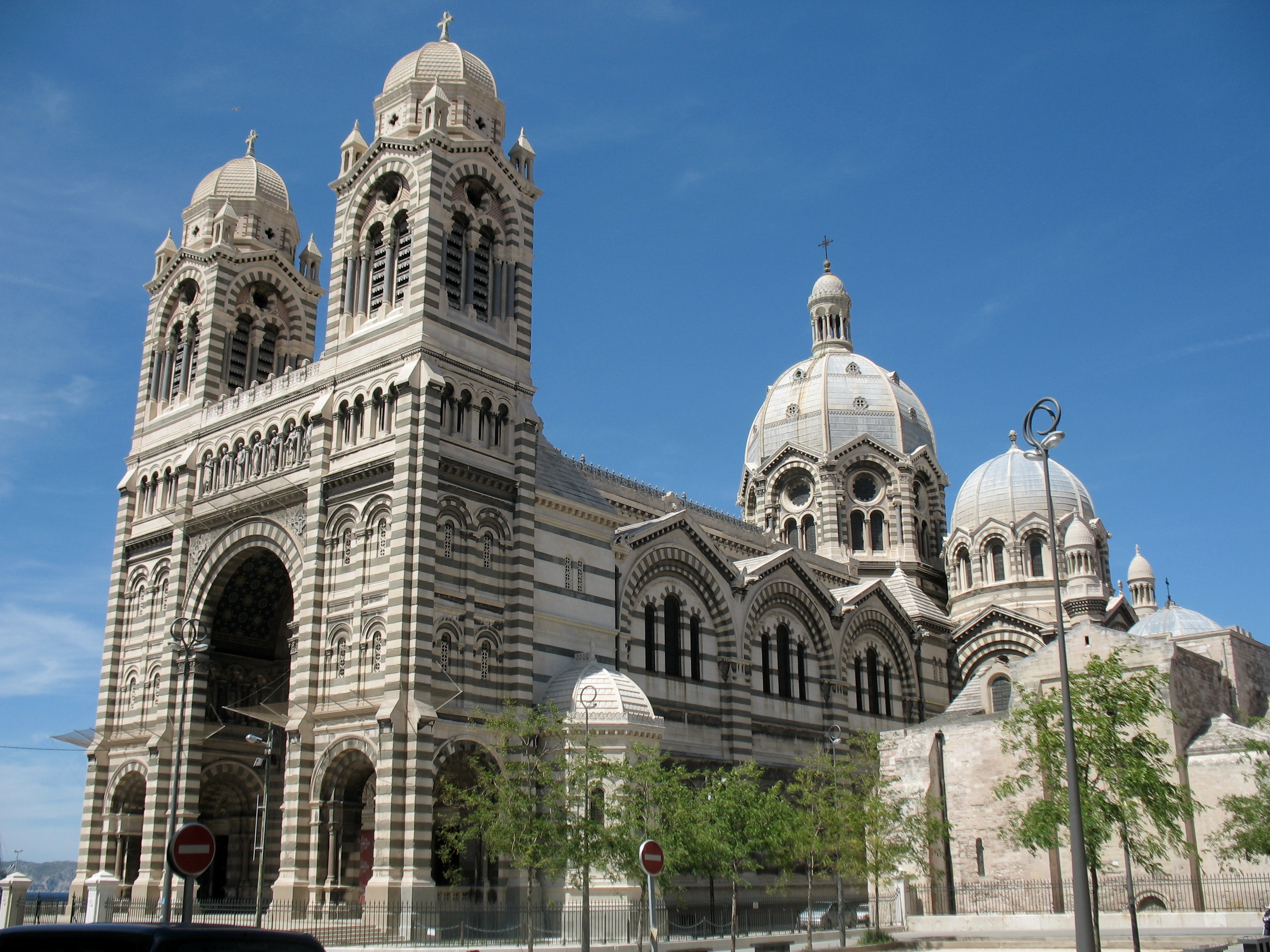
- Marseille Cathedral

Location
- Country: France
- Ecclesiastical province: Marseille

Statistics
- Area: 650 km^{2} (250 sq mi)
- Population: Total; Catholics: (as of 2021); 1,082,300; 741,000 (68.5%)
- Parishes: 110

Information
- Denomination: Catholic Church
- Sui iuris church: Latin Church
- Rite: Roman Rite
- Established: 1st Century
- Cathedral: Cathedral Basilica of St Mary Major
- Patron saint: St Lazarus of Bethany
- Secular priests: 130 (Diocesan); 85 (Religious Orders); 26 Permanent Deacons

Current leadership
- Pope: Leo XIV
- Metropolitan Archbishop: Jean-Marc Aveline
- Suffragans: Archdiocese of Aix-en-Provence and Arles; Diocese of Ajaccio; Diocese of Nice; Archdiocese of Avignon; Diocese of Digne; Diocese of Fréjus–Toulon; Diocese of Gap and Embrun
- Episcopal Vicars: Alexis Leproux
- Bishops emeritus: Georges Pontier

Map

Website
- Website of the Archdiocese

Ecclesiastical province of Marseille

The Archdiocese of Marseille (Latin: Archidioecesis Massiliensis; French: Archidiocèse de Marseille) is a Latin Church ecclesiastical jurisdiction or archdiocese of the Catholic Church in France. The archepiscopal see is in the city of Marseille, and the diocese comprises the arrondissement of Marseille, a subdivision of the department of Bouches-du-Rhône in the Region of Provence-Alpes-Côte d'Azur.

== History ==
The Church of Marseille is said to have been erected in the first century by St. Lazarus, the young man mentioned in the Gospels who had been raised from the dead by Jesus Christ himself. His family migrated to Provence at some point after the Resurrection.

=== Revolution ===
The diocese of Marseille was abolished during the French Revolution, under the Civil Constitution of the Clergy (1790). Its territory was subsumed into the new diocese, called the 'Bouches-du-Rhone', which was part of the Metropolitanate called the 'Metropole des Côtes de la Méditerranée (which included ten new 'departements'). The electors of 'Bouches-du-Rhone' met at Aix beginning on 19 February 1791, and on 23 February elected Abbé Charles Benoît Roux, curé of Eyragues near Arles. He was consecrated in Paris by Constitutional Bishops Gobel, Miroudot and Gouttes. He very much enjoyed the social life of Marseille, but after the execution of Louis XVI on 21 January 1793, Roux joined the counter-revolutionaries. When Marseille was occupied by troops of the Convention, he fled to Aix. He was arrested and imprisoned on 20 September; he was taken to Marseille, where he faced a tribunal of the Revolution which condemned him to death. He was executed on 5 April 1794.

=== An archdiocese ===
The diocese was raised to the level of an Archdiocese on 31 January 1948 by Pope Pius XII. The suffragans of the archdiocese are: the Archdiocese of Aix, the Diocese of Ajaccio, the Archdiocese of Avignon, the Diocese of Digne, the Diocese of Fréjus-Toulon, the Diocese of Gap, and the Diocese of Nice.

In recent times the Archdiocese of Marseille has suffered from significant shortage of priests, despite having a reported Catholic population of over 700,000 not a single priest was ordained in 2018 or 2019.

== Bishops and Archbishops of Marseille ==
=== to 1000 ===
- Oresius (ca. 314)
- Proculus
- Venerius (ca. 431–451)
- Eustasius (attested in 463)
- Graecus
- Honoratus (ca. 496–500)
- Cannatus (second half of the fifth century)
- Theodorus (ca. 580s)
- Serenus
- Petrus of Marseille
- Abdalong (8th century)
- Maurontus (ca. 780)
- Yvo (attested on 12 March 781)
- Wadalus (813–818)
- Theobertus (ca. 822–841)
- Alboin (attested 843/844)
- Litiduinus (attested in 878 and 879)
- Berengarius (attested in 884)
- [Gulfaric] (9th century)
- [Venator] (9th century)
- Drogon (attested in 923 and 924)
- Pons (977–1008)

=== 1000–1500 ===
- Pons (1008–1073)
- Raymond (1073 – 7 November 1122)
- Raymond de Soliers (1122 – 26 April 1151)
- Pierre (1151 – 2 April 1170)
- Fulco de Thorame (1170 – 31 March 1188)
- Rainier (1188–1214)
- Pierre de Montlaur (7 October 1217 – 29 August 1229)
- Benoît d'Aligan, O.S.B. (1229–1267)
- Raymond of Nîmes (23 December 1267 – 15 July 1288)
- Durand de Trésémines (17 April 1289 – 3 August 1312)
- Raymond Robaudi (1 January 1313 – 12 September 1319) (transferred to Archbishopric of Embrun)
- Gasbert de la Val (18 September 1319 – 26 August 1323) (transferred to Arles)
- Aymar Amiel (26 August 1323 – 23 December 1333)
- Jean Artaudi (10 January 1334 – 1335, after July 7)
- Joannes Gasqui (13 October 1335 – 10 September 1344)
- Robert de Mandagot (13 September 1344 – 1358)
- Hugh d'Arpajon (4 February 1359 – 31 May 1361)
- Pierre Fabri (1361, June–September?)
- Guillaume Sudre, O.P. (27 August 1361 – 1366)
- [ Philippe de Cabassole ] (1366–1368) Administrator
- Guillaume de la Voute (9 December 1368 – 1 July 1379) (transferred to Valence-et-Die, by Clement VII)
- Aymar de La Voute (1379-1395)
- Benoît II (1397-1418)
- Paul de Sade (1418-1420)
- Avignon Nicolaï (1420-1421)
- André Boutaric (1433)
- Barthélémy Rocalli (1433-1445)
- Louis de Glandevès (1445)
- Nicola de Brancas (1445-1466)
- Jean Alardeau (1466-1496)
- Ogier d'Anglure (1496-1506)

=== 1500 to 1700 ===
- Pierre Baudonis (1506)
- Antoine Dufour (1506-1509)
- Claude de Seyssel (1511-1517)
- Innocent Cibo (1517-1530)
- Jean-Baptiste Cibo (1530-1550)
- Cristoforo Guidalotti Ciocchi del Monte (1550-1556)
- Pierre Ragueneau (1556-1572)
- Frédéric Ragueneau (1572-1603)
- Jacques Turricella (1605-1618)
- Arthur d'Épinay de Saint-Luc (1619-1621)
- Nicolas Coëffeteau (1621)
- François de Loménie (1624-1639)
- Eustache Gault (1639-1640)
- Jean-Baptiste Gault (1640-1643)
- Étienne de Puget (1644-1668)
- Toussaint de Forbin-Janson (1668–1679)
- Jean-Baptiste d'Estampes de Valençay (12 January 1680 – 6 January 1684)
- Charles Gaspard Guillaume de Vintimille du Luc (21 January 1692 – 14 May 1708)

=== 1700 to 1948 ===
- Bernard de Poudenx (14 May 1708 – 19 January 1709)
- Henri François Xavier de Belsunce de Castelmoron (19 February 1710 – 4 June 1755)
- Jean-Baptiste de Belloy (4 August 1755 – 21 September 1801)
  - Charles Benoît Roux (Constitutional Bishop) (1791–1794)

[1801–1817] Diocese of Marseille suppressed, by the Concordat of 1801.

- Charles-Fortuné de Mazenod (1823–1837)
- Charles-Joseph-Eugene de Mazenod (1837–1861)
- Patrice Cruice (18 Jun 1861 – 1 Sep 1865)
- Charles-Philippe Place (6 Jan 1866 – 13 Jun 1878)
- Joseph Robert (13 Jun 1878 – 19 Nov 1900)
- Cardinal Pierre Andrieu (5 Apr 1901 – 2 Jan 1909)
- Joseph-Marie Fabre (29 Apr 1909 – 9 Jan 1923 )
- Daniel Champavier (19 Jan 1923 – 2 Feb 1928 )
- Maurice-Louis Dubourg (17 Dec 1928 – 9 Dec 1936 )
- Jean Delay (14 Aug 1937 – 5 Sep 1956 ) first Archbishop of Marseille (31 January 1948)

=== Archbishops of Marseille since 1948 ===
- Marc-Armand Lallier (28 September 1956 – 26 August 1966 )
- Georges Jacquot (1 November 1966 – 25 September 1970 )
- Cardinal Roger Etchegaray (22 December 1970 – 13 April 1985 )
- Cardinal Robert Coffy (13 April 1985 – 22 April 1995 )
- Cardinal Bernard Panafieu (22 April 1995 – 12 May 2006 )
- Georges Pontier (12 May 2006 – 8 August 2019)
- Cardinal Jean-Marc Aveline (8 August 2019 –)

== See also ==
- Catholic Church in France
- Église Saint-Joseph (Marseille)
- List of Catholic dioceses in France
- Maurice Dubourg

== Bibliography ==
=== Reference works ===
- Albanés, J. H.; Chevalier, Ulysse (1899). Gallia christiana novissima: Marseille (Évêques, prévots, statuts) (in French and Latin). Montbéliard: Société anonyme d'imprimerie montbéliardaise.
- Gams, Pius Bonifatius (1873). Series episcoporum Ecclesiae catholicae: quotquot innotuerunt a beato Petro apostolo. Ratisbon: Typis et Sumptibus Georgii Josephi Manz. pp. 573–575. (Use with caution; obsolete)
- Eubel, Conradus, ed. (1913). Hierarchia catholica, Tomus 1 (second ed.). Münster: Libreria Regensbergiana. (in Latin) pp. 329–330.
- Eubel, Conradus, ed. (1914). Hierarchia catholica, Tomus 2 (second ed.). Münster: Libreria Regensbergiana. (in Latin) p. 187.
- Gulik, Guilelmus (1923). Eubel, Conradus (ed.). Hierarchia catholica, Tomus 3 (second ed.). Münster: Libreria Regensbergiana. p. 237-238.
- Gauchat, Patritius (Patrice) (1935). Hierarchia catholica IV (1592-1667). Münster: Libraria Regensbergiana. pp. 234.
- Ritzler, Remigius; Sefrin, Pirminus (1952). Hierarchia catholica medii et recentis aevi V (1667-1730). Patavii: Messagero di S. Antonio. pp. 260.
- Ritzler, Remigius; Sefrin, Pirminus (1958). Hierarchia catholica medii et recentis aevi VI (1730-1799). Patavii: Messagero di S. Antonio. p. 280.
- Ritzler, Remigius; Sefrin, Pirminus (1968). Hierarchia Catholica medii et recentioris aevi sive summorum pontificum, S. R. E. cardinalium, ecclesiarum antistitum series... A pontificatu Pii PP. VII (1800) usque ad pontificatum Gregorii PP. XVI (1846) (in Latin). Vol. VII. Monasterii: Libr. Regensburgiana.
- Remigius Ritzler; Pirminus Sefrin (1978). Hierarchia catholica Medii et recentioris aevi... A Pontificatu PII PP. IX (1846) usque ad Pontificatum Leonis PP. XIII (1903) (in Latin). Vol. VIII. Il Messaggero di S. Antonio.
- Pięta, Zenon (2002). Hierarchia catholica medii et recentioris aevi... A pontificatu Pii PP. X (1903) usque ad pontificatum Benedictii PP. XV (1922) (in Latin). Vol. IX. Padua: Messagero di San Antonio. ISBN 978-88-250-1000-8.

=== Studies ===
- Albanès, Joseph-Hyacinthe (1884). Armorial & sigillographie des évêques de Marseille: avec des notices historiques sur chacun de ces prélats, publiés sous les auspices de Mgr Lévêque de Marseille (in French). Marseille: Marius Olive. [uncritical of Christian mythology, uses hagiography as history]
- Belsunce, Henri François Xavier de (1747). L ́ antiquité de l ́Église de Marseille, et la succession de ses évêques (in French). Vol. Tome I (to 1192). Marseille: Ve. J.P. Brebion.
- Belsunce, Henri François Xavier de (1747). L'antiquité de l'eglise de Marseille et la succession de ses évêques (in French). Vol. Tome II (1192-1433). Marseille: Brébion.
- Belsunce, Henri François Xavier de (1751). L'antiquité de l'eglise de Marseille et la succession de ses évêques (in French). Vol. III (1433-1708). Marseille: Brébion. pp. 201–206.
- De Vic, Cl.; Vaissete, J. (1876). Histoire generale de Languedoc (in French). Vol. Tome IV. Toulouse: Edouard Privat.
- Duchesne, Louis (1907). Fastes épiscopaux de l'ancienne Gaule: I. Provinces du Sud-Est. Paris: Fontemoing. pp. 274–277. second edition (in French)
- Société bibliographique (France) (1907). L'épiscopat français depuis le Concordat jusqu'à la Séparation (1802-1905). Paris: Librairie des Saints-Pères.
