= Georges Pontier =

French prelate of the Catholic Church (born 1943)

- Archbishop of Marseille
- Diocese: Archdiocese of Marseille
- Installed: 12 May 2006
- Term ended: 8 August 2019
- Predecessor: Bernard Panafieu
- Successor: Jean-Marc Aveline

Orders
- Ordination: 3 July 1966

Personal details
- Born: Georges Paul Pontier; 1 May 1943 (age 83) Lavaur, France
- Education: Pontifical Gregorian University; University of Toulouse

Georges Paul Pontier (French pronunciation: [ʒɔʁʒ(ə) pɔ̃tje]; born 1 May 1943) is a French prelate of the Catholic Church who was Archbishop of Marseille from 2006 to 2019 and President of the Episcopal Conference of France from 2013 to 2019. He was named apostolic administrator of the Archdiocese of Paris in December 2021.

== Biography ==
Georges Pontier was born 1 May 1943 in Lavaur in the Tarn. After studying at the major seminary of Albi he completed his training at the Pontifical Gregorian University in Rome where he obtained a degree in theology, then a master's degree in Modern Literature at the University of Toulouse. He was ordained a priest of the Diocese of Albi on 3 July 1966. He taught at the minor seminary of Saint-Sulpice-la-Pointe and became its rector. He was curate and then archpriest of the Albi cathedral from 1985 to 1988.

Pope John Paul II appointed him Bishop of Digne on 2 February 1988 and he was consecrated on 20 March. John Paul made him Bishop of La Rochelle and Saintes on 5 August 1996.

Pope Benedict XVI named him Archbishop of Marseille on 12 May 2006.

Though orthodox in matters of theology, with respect to same-sex marriage and the ordination of women, for example, his rapprochement with Islam made him the "bête noire" of the political right. He was particularly engaged by the social situation of the Roma and the undocumented. In 2010 he arranged for retired priests to vacate six apartments in a Church-owned apartment building in the Saint-Pierre district of Marseille to allow for six Roma families to be housed there, provoking resistance from locals and their political representatives. And in 2017 he called on the French government to devise better solutions for the Roma who are being "shuffled from one place to another".

In the Bishops Conference of France (CEF) he was vice president from 2001 to 2007, headed its Studies and Projects Committee from 2008 to 2013, and president from 2013 to 2019. In October 2015, as president of the CEF, he attended the Synod of Bishops on the Family.

He declined to endorse the "proclamation of freedom of expression" that Reporters Without Borders invited all religious leaders to sign following the Charlie Hebdo shooting in January 2015. In a letter to the bishops of France, he said the statement itself seemed to doubt the commitment of religious leaders to freedom of expression and singled them out when all leaders of civic society should share this commitment.

Pope Francis accepted his resignation, submitted as required when Pontier turned 75, on 8 August 2019. Auxiliary Bishop Jean-Marc Aveline was appointed to succeed him.

On 11 January 2021, Pope Francis named him Apostolic Administrator of the Archdiocese of Avignon.

On 2 December 2021, Pope Francis named him Apostolic Administrator of the Archdiocese of Paris after the resignation of Archbishop Michel Aupetit.

== See also ==
- Michel Mouïsse
