= Maurice Dubourg =

French Catholic priest (1878–1954)

Louis Maurice Dubourg
- Archbishop of Besançon
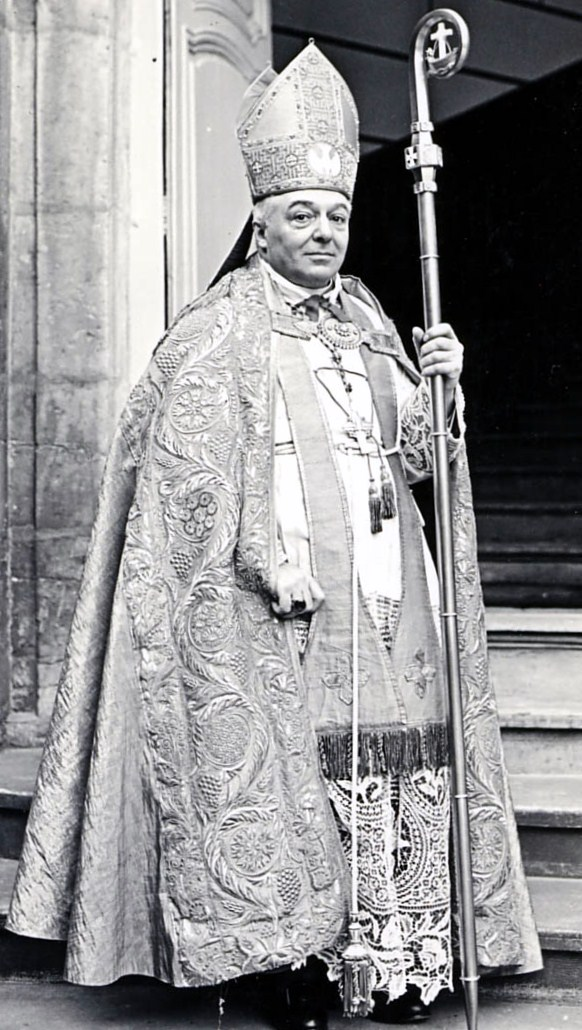
- Maurice Dubourg in Easter, 1937
- Church: Catholic Church
- Archdiocese: Archdiocese of Besançon
- In office: 9 December 1936 – 31 January 1954
- Predecessor: Charles Binet
- Successor: Marcel-Marie Dubois
- Previous post: Bishop of Marseille (1928-1936)

Orders
- Ordination: 3 July 1909 by Léon-Adolphe Amette
- Consecration: 25 February 1929 by Charles Binet

Personal details
- Born: 8 August 1878 Besançon, Doubs, France
- Died: 31 January 1954 (aged 75) Besançon, Doubs, France

Maurice Dubourg (8 August 1878 – 31 January 1954) was a Franc-Comtois cleric of the Roman Catholic Church, diocesan canon priest, then bishop of Marseille from 1928 to 1936, and finally archbishop of Besançon from 1936 to 1954. During the Second World War, he recognized the legitimacy and values of the regime established by the French head of state, Marshal Philippe Pétain, but showed concern for the fate of Spanish refugees and workers subject to the Service du travail obligatoire (STO). After the war, he was behind the creation of the Notre-Dame de la Libération votive monument on Besançon's colline des Bois, and supported innovations in sacred art within the diocese of Besançon.

== Biography ==
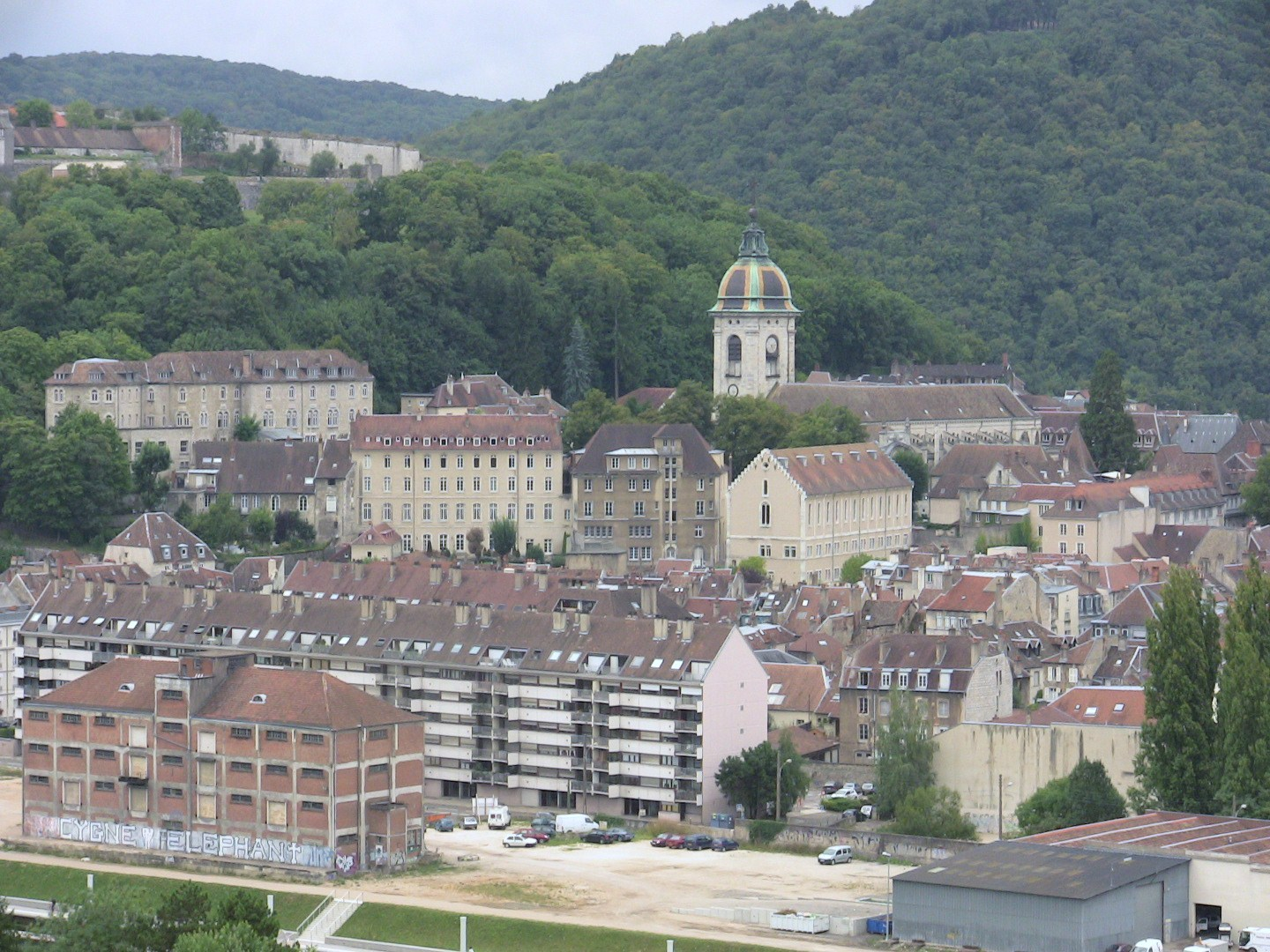
Besançon, the Saint-Jean district.

=== Childhood, studies and early career ===
Louis Maurice Dubourg was born on August 8, 1878 in Besançon (Doubs). In the autumn of 1882, little Dubourg entered the Institution Sainte-Marie in the Saint-Jean district of the Comtois capital; still wearing the infant dress, he was then four years old. Here, now known as the Collège Saint-Jean, the future archbishop studied for his baccalaureate in philosophy. The young Dubourg then attended the Faculty (or School) of Law in Besançon. In Paris, he continued his studies as a student and trainee at the Conférence des avocats. Beginning his career as a young Parisian lawyer, he was also active in the Sillon, the political and ideological movement of journalist and politician Marc Sangnier, which sought to bring Catholics closer to the Republic and free workers from the influence of the anticlerical left. Dubourg was also a member of a Saint-Vincent-de-Paul conference, where he helped poor families of Comtois exiled to Paris. In 1903, the Abbé founded the famous Vesoul sports club, l'Avant-garde de la Motte. In 1906, Maître Dubourg entered the Parisian Séminaire de Saint-Sulpice, an institution of higher learning designed to train Catholic priests. After three years, he was ordained priest on July 3, 1909, at the age of 31, and began his career in Vesoul as curate.

=== Military mobilization ===
During the First World War, Abbé Dubourg was an officer, military chaplain and stretcher-bearer. On mobilization, he joined the 7th Army Corps, and through his stubbornness and defiance of all regulations, managed to get himself assigned to the 170th Infantry Regiment, which belonged to an attack division specializing in "hard knocks". According to General Medical Officer Fourgereau, "courageous he certainly was; at times, he even seemed reckless... But no, M. l'Aumônier was not. l'Aumônier was not reckless; he was in charge of a service whose importance and complexity frightened me... But if Abbé Dubourg was courageous, with a calm simplicity, he was also courageous with a chic that was universally admired, and this chic was due above all to his legendary smile, which he never lost in any circumstance, however tragic". He was awarded the Croix de Guerre 1914-1918, and received five commendations for his "legendary bravery". Much later, only a few days before his death, he was named Commander of the Legion of Honor.

=== First works ===
With peace restored, Abbé Dubourg returned to Vesoul. In 1919, he was appointed director of Œuvres de l'archidiocèse de Besançon, in the very Bisontine Rue de la Vieille-Monnaie where he worked alone with Abbé Gaillard. From 1919 to 1928, he was the reorganizer of the Ligue Féminine and the director and active rallying agent of the "Union des Catholiques du Diocèse", a union born of the "Association des chefs de famille" of the Besançon diocese, launched before the war to defend school neutrality.

During the same period, with Canon Dubourg multiplying groups, training chaplains and inspiring young personalities, youth movements resumed their activities (from 1919): the "Thom", the brilliant Union Comtoise and above all the Association catholique de la jeunesse française (A.C.J.F.). Within the Œuvres diocésaines, the "Comité régional" operated, with an average age of twenty. Nineteen twenty-two was the year of a new beginning for the A.C.J.F., which had known great hours before 1914. The motto was "Piety, Study, Action", within the following progressive framework: Family, Profession, City. "You will never pray enough", "Never stay a day, never a night, with a mortal sin, if you have to, go and wake up a priest", repeated Canon Dubourg, "so tenderly good", but "without weakness on principles". Under his aegis, Eucharistic Congresses were held in Gray (Haute-Saône) in 1924, Montbéliard (Doubs) in 1925 and Morteau (Haut-Doubs) in 1926. In parallel with the cercles d'études, which had more difficulty getting off the ground, Canon Dubourg founded a small Catholic sheet, Vers l'Avenir, a youth newspaper. It has 3,500 subscribers. The Regional Committee visits parishes, creates and animates groups, and tries to counteract the anti-clericalism back on the agenda. Committee meetings and so-called "mass" meetings score at least one point. Canon Dubourg likes to remind us: "Action is only a means, don't make it an end; know how to convince without offending; serve without thinking of receiving". One autumn evening, leaving the Kursaal in Besançon, an "immense monome of three hundred young people" walked along the Grande Rue and, facing Saint-Pierre church in the town center, prayed to the Virgin Mary to "forgive and enlighten". In 1923 (the first issue dates from January), Canon Dubourg also founded a new journal, Dieu et Famille, "le journal de l'Union des Catholiques", in order, according to J. Panier, to "give instructions, create, outside the parties, a specifically Catholic action". The paper was published monthly, dealing with family, school, agricultural and social issues, and subscriptions cost no more than two francs, making it affordable for everyone. On February 28, 1928, Institution Sainte-Marie welcomed its former pupil Dubourg.

=== Bishop of Marseille, then Archbishop of Besançon ===
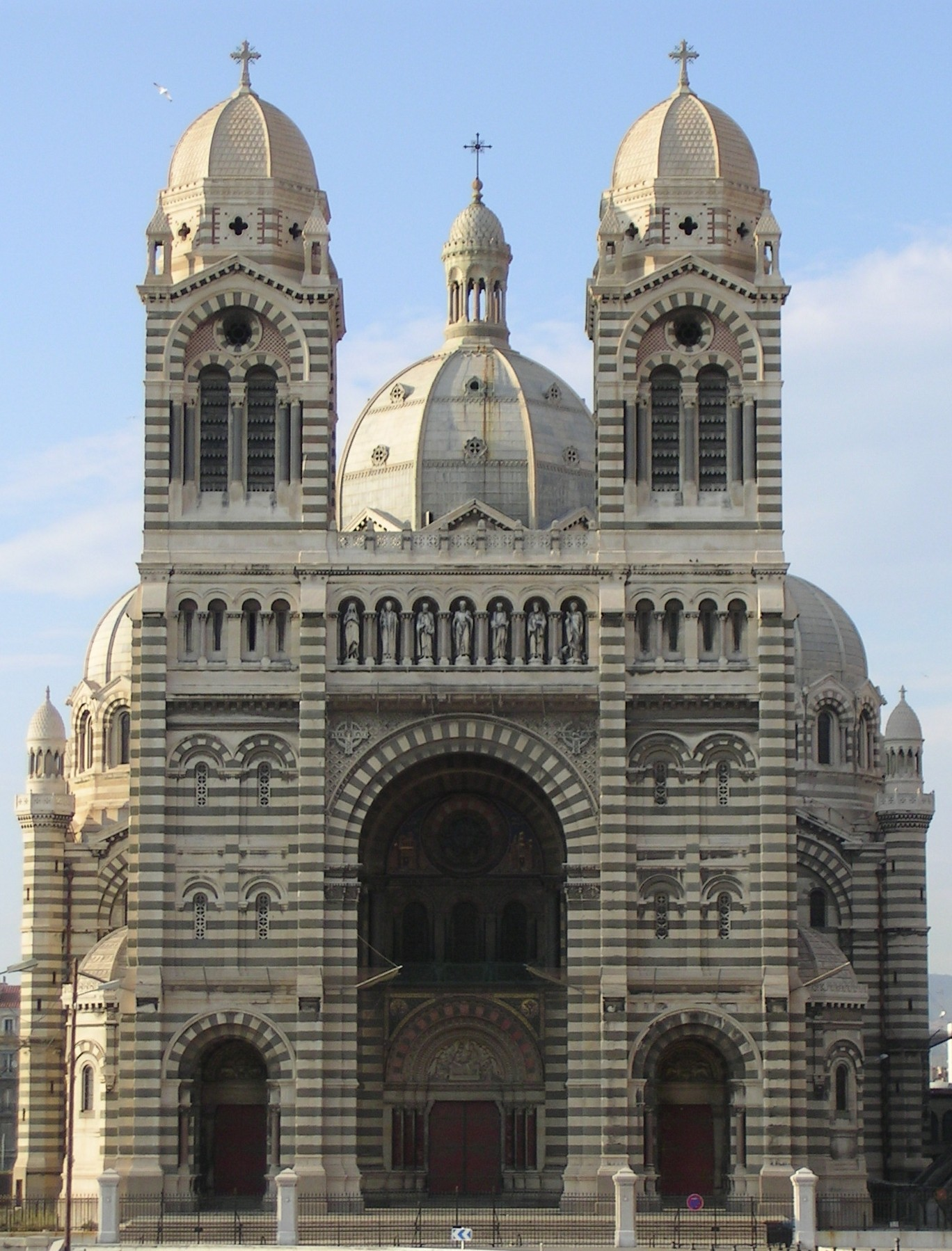
Sainte-Marie-Majeure or La Major, cathedral church of the archdiocese of Marseille.

On December 17, 1928, Canon Dubourg was appointed Bishop of Marseille. He was consecrated bishop on February 25, 1929 by Cardinal Charles-Henri-Joseph Binet, Archbishop of Besançon, and Paul Rémond, then Chaplain General of the Army of the Rhine, titular Bishop of Clysma (de). The new bishop was officially installed on March 9, 1929. On his way to Marseille, Dubourg donated his family home in the Besançon suburb of Gouille, the Villa Saint-Charles (later known as the Villa Episcopale), to the Besançon archdiocese for use as a retreat center. Thanks to NNSS Béjot and Pourchet (future bishop of Saint-Flour), the villa would host groups from Jeunesse étudiante chrétienne, Catholic Action, priestly retreats, school retreats. After Dubourg's appointment to Marseille, his successor at the Direction des Œuvres de l'archidiocèse de Besançon was Abbé Gaillard.

The new bishop's first ministry, lasting eight years, was marked by the crowning of the statue of Notre-Dame-de-la-Garde in 1931 and the great Catholic Exhibition of 1935. On the day of his enthronement as Archbishop of Besançon, the President of the Marseilles Chamber of Commerce expressed the regret of all Marseillais, many of them protesting against the strange ecclesiastical organization which had turned a bishop of Marseilles into the Archbishop of Besançon.

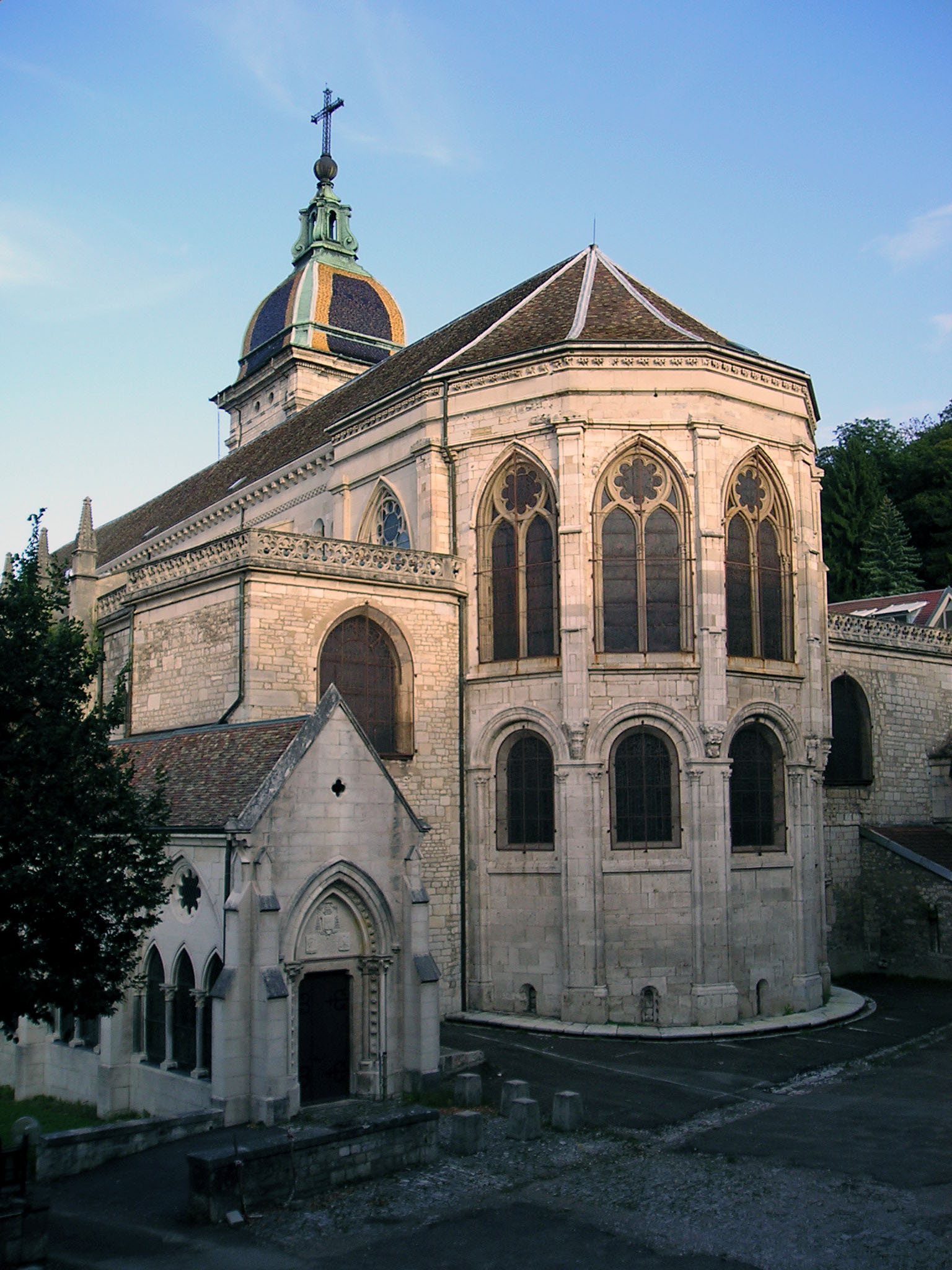
Saint-Jean, cathedral church of the Besançon archdiocese.

Dubourg was appointed to the latter position on December 9, 1936, and was enthroned in the Comtois capital on February 18, 1937. Under his pontificate, the Maîtrise of Besançon's Saint-Jean cathedral was rebuilt, the future Collège technique Saint-Joseph was built in Besançon, a chapel was founded for the Valdahon camp, a catechetical center was opened, the L'Éclair Comtois newspaper was reorganized, a survey was carried out on Church singing and Marian piety, and "Journées liturgiques de malades" were created in Belfort. In 1937, Dubourg welcomed German veterans from Freiburg im Breisgau, who had been invited to Besançon, to the cathedral. Hundreds of young people took part in the tenth anniversary congress of the Jeunesse ouvrière chrétienne and Jeunesse agricole catholique in Paris (1937 and 1938). A pilgrimage of a thousand men went to Lourdes in 1938. 1938, a Marian year to mark the third centenary of Louis XIII's vow, culminated in the Belfort Congress. In Meaux, Dubourg spoke at the anniversary of the Marne victory. In July 1939, Dubourg celebrated the eighth centenary of the Grâce-Dieu abbey, the centenary of the Refuge, the Gray-Mattincourt road inaugurated in honor of Saint Pierre Fourier, and the inauguration of a statue of Saint Colomband in the courtyard of the Luxeuil-les-Bains seminary. On March 19, 1938, Dubourg blessed the Collège Saint-Joseph, created by Abbé Gaillard.

=== The Second World War ===
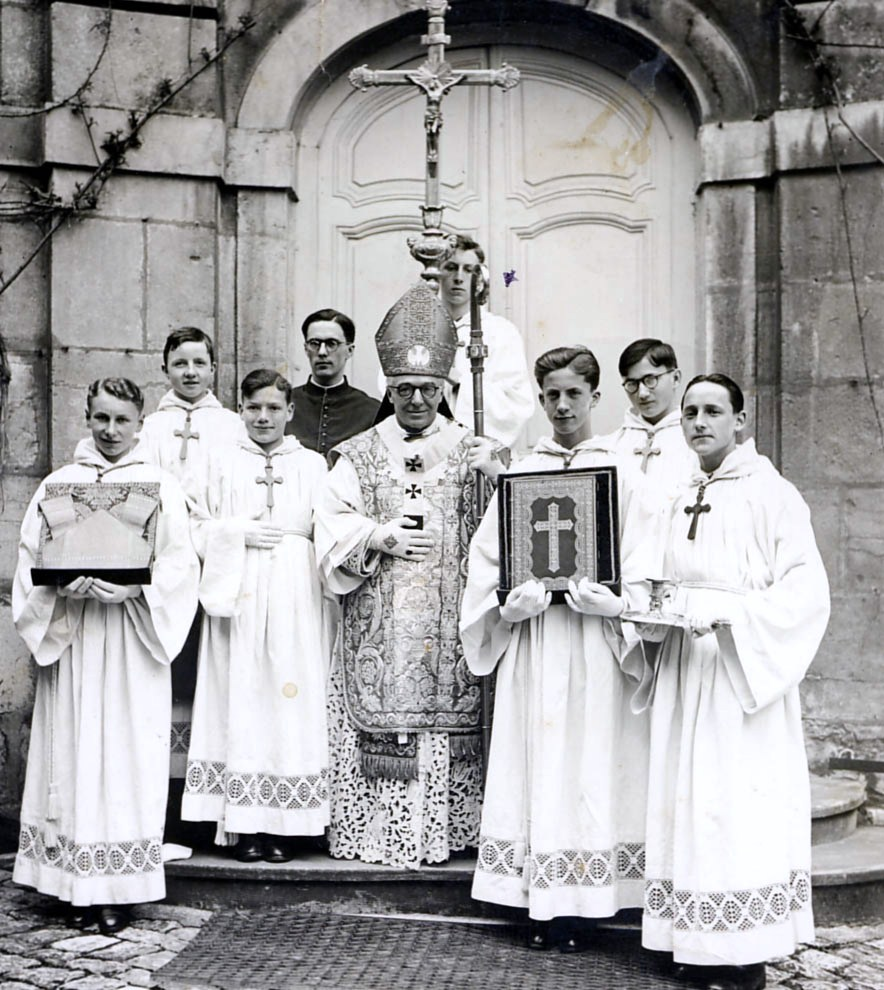
Maurice Dubourg (center) in 1939.

The city of Besançon was occupied by the German National Socialist army on June 16, 1940; Dubourg expressed himself in two notes: the first, which he read in the church of Saint-Pierre on Sunday June 23, 1940, the second on June 27, 1940: "Let us say it loud and clear, it is a betrayal of the fatherland and honor to welcome as friends those who come to us, no matter how correct they may be, with the sole right of force. Let's give them what we can't refuse them: that's the law of war. Let us be correct, but not servile. Even more so, no smiles of complacency, no familiarity. Let us remain dignified... The war is not over. And no one knows what the future holds". These statements led to the seizure by the German occupiers of the Semaine Religieuse, which had published these texts, and to the ten-day detention of Vicar General Galland at the Kommandantur headquarters, where he was held responsible.

A few weeks later, at the "Journées Sacerdotales" in September–October 1940, Dubourg explained to his clergy the difficulties of pastoral practice under the new regime: "Does this mean that our ministry will not encounter enormous difficulties? Assuming that institutions are significantly improved, minds will not be changed any time soon. And certain measures of strict justice, such as the repeal of the 1904 law, far from calming minds, will serve as a pretext for new anti-clerical campaigns. We'll be watched, spied on, fought? What can we do? (...) We must not triumph as if we had won a battle". Dubourg felt that Marshal Philippe Pétain's government was legitimate, even after the landings of 1942. In front of his chapter, he declared in January 1941: "Submissive to religious authority as our faith makes it our duty, we respect, we venerate and we love the Head of State. We are not, and never will be, among those who presume to judge and condemn his decisions, when they know nothing of the reasons behind them". For months, every first Friday at 7 a.m., Dubourg received a group of men at his home to study the situation and the behavior the French should adopt.

On June 19, 1941, he asked his parish priests to read a pastoral letter on "Our Present Duty", in which he reminded his clergy and faithful of Leo XIII's doctrine on submission to legitimate authority. He wished to "remove the confusion in which certain minds currently find themselves, worried about the course of events and reluctant to follow the Head of State down the path he has embarked upon... ". Some parish priests glossed over the letter, others mumbled it unintelligibly to their congregations, and still others thought that the text had been imposed on the archbishop and was therefore not binding on their conscience. These initiatives were deplored by Dubourg, who asked that "the effigy of the glorious soldier who presides over the destinies of France (...) a symbol of valour, heroism, devotion and self-sacrifice" be displayed in parish buildings. Indeed, anxious to re-Christianize the country, the prelate of Comtois adheres to the values of the new regime: work, family, fatherland. With his legal training, he was severe about the looting and summary executions carried out by some Resistance groups. He wanted priests to stay out of political issues, and maintained the incompatibility between the leadership of Catholic movements and political activism for lay people. Like his fellow French bishops, Dubourg was opposed to the creation of a single youth movement, and insisted on the determined involvement of priests in Catholic Action. With regard to the crucifixes that had been placed in schools in over two hundred communes in the Doubs region, Dubourg would later state, in a letter written in 1950 that was not made public but is circulating: "The archbishopric has never ordered or advised the placing of crucifixes in any public school". The Comtois archbishop did not publicly condemn anti-Semitic measures. He did, however, ask the Superior of the Major Seminary to draft a note for oral instruction to the clergy: "All the natural rights of man are infringed by the measures of proscription against the Jews (...). Seizing the sick, separating families, confining them to inadequate premises - we wouldn't do that for livestock. Ripping children away from their families, such an outburst of violence is a humiliation for humanity". These words remain confidential. Together with his childhood friend Dr. Maxime Druhen and Chanoine Rémillet, parish priest of Sainte-Madeleine church, he saved the synagogue's scrolls of the Law from destruction. They hid the precious documents in the latter's workroom until the Liberation or elsewhere, according to sources. Furniture was also saved in the same way. Their courageous action was hailed as a gesture of brotherhood on the occasion of the synagogue's 125th anniversary.

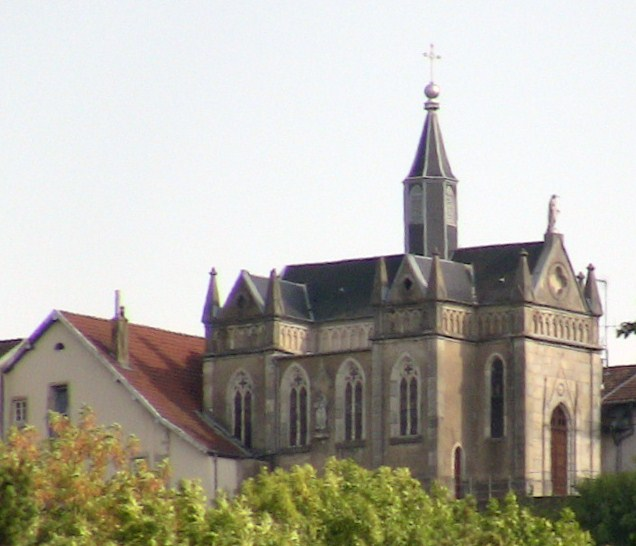
The hill of Les Bois and its chapel dedicated to Notre-Dame des Bois are the town's spiritual landmarks, attracting pilgrims since at least the 16th century.

With regard to the Service du travail obligatoire, Dubourg expressed himself as follows in one of his Lettres au clergé: "What can we do that will be effective? We cannot contemplate isolated verbal protests, which would run the risk - if they caught the attention of those they were intended to reach - of having the effect, if not of increasing the number of those requisitioned - at least of worsening the fate reserved for them!". Dubourg and three other bishops reminded their diocesans "that war has severe laws, and that the vanquished must suffer the misfortune he was unable to avoid". They also deplored "the harshness of requisitions, but have no doubt that severe measures will be taken to avoid similar sadness". In their view, "it would be inconceivable for these mass departures to take on the character of a real deportation". In mid-December 1942, Dubourg wrote to Cardinal Emmanuel Suhard: "I know that similar requisitions are being carried out elsewhere: in the North, in the Cher, in Saône-et-Loire, etc." He therefore proposed that the Assembly of Cardinals and Archbishops write a "letter of encouragement to the faithful at the beginning of 1943, which would be particularly well received. It would be easy to slip in a word that would be like a protest, or at least an expression of our sorrow and astonishment at these departures".

Throughout the Second World War, Dubourg multiplied his calls to prayer. He led pilgrims to the Notre-Dame des Bois chapel, as they climbed the Bisontine hill barefoot. In 1942, the missions resumed. Local pilgrimages were just as numerous and fervent. The movements continued despite the suppression of their liaison body. On June 16, 1944, Dubourg prayed: "Our Lady of all the sanctuaries of Franche-Comté, I beg you to save our city; I vow to raise a monumental statue to you on the hill of Notre-Dame des Bois, if we are protected, if our city escapes destruction". And on June 17, 1944: "I believe with the Church and with all its sons, so numerous in this assembly, that a nation can only live, prosper and last if it respects God and observes his commandments. God must have his place with us, the first place in our souls, in our homes, in our institutions. He is the irreplaceable foundation of morality. I believe with the Church that all authority comes from God, both temporal and spiritual. We owe the leaders who have the honor and responsibility of governing the country respect and submission, and it's our duty to pray for them. It may please many to hear these truths repeated today. I asserted them at a time when it might have displeased some. You see, principles are principles. And the Church must teach them in season and out of season, without any quest for popularity, with the sole concern of the truth. (...) Soon, we hope, we'll put an end to war, that infernal crusher of bodies. Let's not enslave souls, suffocate them in matter. (...)". At the Liberation, Dubourg was instructed to recite the following prayer to Notre-Dame: "Reine de France, rendez nous la paix, et, dans la concorde, réunies les Français".

=== Post-war ===
During the war, and long after, Dubourg encouraged the activities of the Red Cross, the Œuvres d'assistance aux vieillards, and the reception center for North Africans. Every year, he paid a long visit to the Butte prison, personally comforting each prisoner. As early as 1943, the Archbishop of Besançon had renewed the Diocesan Commission for Sacred Art, in collaboration with François Mathey, who was chief curator at the Musée des Arts Décoratifs in Paris from 1955 to 1986, and Mme Cornillor. He decided to continue the public Corpus Christi processions that had resumed during the war. This initiative was sanctioned by a lawsuit that was annulled by the Conseil d'État. In 1945, resentment caused by electoral struggles led Dubourg to cancel the rally planned for the Feast of Christ the King. After Father Florin Callerand's ordination on June 21, 1946, Dubourg chose him as his secretary, and later as his confessor. In October 1946, Dubourg inaugurated Collège Saint-Joseph, which had been refurbished after the occupation by the German army. On this occasion, he was surrounded by a large number of intellectual and business notables, Besançon clergy and friends of free education, many of whom had come from afar.

Dubourg liked to see parishes gather for large events. This was the case for the blessing of the foundation stone in 1945 and the inauguration of the votive monument to Notre-Dame de la Libération on September 8, 1949, which drew 50,000 people, and for the Grand Retour de Notre-Dame de Boulogne in 1946, for the Youth Congress, which brought together 15,000 young people at Chamars (Besançon) on Easter Monday, April 7, 1947, for the arrival of the relics of Saint Therese of the Child Jesus on May 3, 1947, or for the preaching of the three Lenten seasons of 1938, 1945 and 1953. In 1948, the Great Mission of Besançon was preached in every parish in the city. When new districts were created, a parish was founded and a church built: Colombier-Fontaine, Sainte-Thérèse de Belfort, Saint-Louis de Besançon, Sainte-Thérèse-de-l'Enfant-Jésus de Béthoncourt, Sainte-Croix de Sochaux (in 1942), le Sacré-Cœur d'Audincourt, Sainte-Jeanne-d'Arc de Belfort, Montreux-Château, Sainte-Suzanne, Tavey, etc. The Direction des Œuvres is spread over three houses: Besançon, Belfort and Vesoul, with some twenty chaplains on secondment. The number of deaneries in the diocese increased from 26 to 33 in Doubs, from 28 to 29 in Haute-Saône, and from four to six in Territoire de Belfort. Some projects came to nothing: the Diocesan Manual, launched before the war, saw only a limited edition in 1948. The Franciscan scholasticate planned for Notre-Dame des Bois in 1945 never came to fruition. The construction of the monument to the Liberation was judged by some to be too costly or unnecessary. The grand reunions Dubourg loved were considered too outward and triumphal.

In March 1950, Dubourg appointed Abbé Jean Nappez as his new private secretary (a position he held until 1952). He then appointed his former secretary, Father Florin Callerand, director of the Villa Saint-Charles de Gouille, and sent him to Châteauneuf-de-Galaure to meet Marthe Robin. From his meetings with Marthe Robin and following the founding grace received on November 1, 1950, recognized by Dubourg on the day Pope Pius XII proclaimed the dogma of the Assumption, Father Florin Callerand began preaching retreats at the villa Saint-Charles de Gouille, accompanied by a first community nucleus, inspired by the charism of the Foyers de Charité. Under Dubourg's pontificate, diocesan organizations became very active. A religious music center was set up to promote collective singing. Secours Catholique (Catholic Relief Services) established a strong presence in the three départements of the Comtois. The direction of free education expands. The sports federations and the Union française des colonies de vacances (French vacation camp union) required permanent staff to support their numerous subsidiaries. The university parish made inroads, particularly in primary education. Its Lettre aux instituteurs catholiques du Doubs, de la Haute-Saône et du Territoire de Belfort, born clandestinely, had a circulation of 1,200 copies in 1952. It also made inroads in the ecumenical field, taking initiatives as part of Unity Week.

Canon Lucien Ledeur (1911-1975), then secretary of the Diocesan Commission for Sacred Art, played a pivotal role in the remarkable restoration and construction of churches. This ambitious policy garnered significant attention, prompting L'Art Sacré magazine to dedicate a special issue to it in July–August 1952. In 1947, the non-figurative painter Alfred Manessier was commissioned for the stained-glass windows at Les Bréseux; in 1950, the cubist Fernand Léger was commissioned for the stained-glass windows, and the avant-garde Jean Bazaine for the mosaic at the Sacré-Cœur church in Audincourt; in the same year, the non-figurative painter Jean Le Moal was commissioned to paint the Maîche church; and in 1950, the architect Le Corbusier was commissioned to rebuild the Chapelle Notre-Dame-du-Haut on the Bourlémont hilltop in Ronchamp. Dubourg showed his solidarity with the decisions taken, and accepted them, even if he did not always understand the innovative works himself: "Not that I endorse all the conclusions of our commission. It's one thing to authorize the execution of a work, it's quite another to approve it as a perfect work, beyond criticism". Not only did he often have to act as a screen between the Commission and the Vicars General, all of whom were hostile to these artistic innovations, but he also had to act as a shield and screen between the Holy See and the Commission, enabling the latter to continue its work. In 1955, the Holy Office demanded the removal of the Way of the Cross created by sculptor Gabriel Saury from the church in Orchamps-Vennes. Archbishop Dubourg jokingly admitted that he could say goodbye to his cardinal's hat. The importance of Dubourg's work will be felt after his death. The Commission would no longer be able to produce major works. In a letter to Alfred Manessier, François Mathey explains the reasons for this: "Everything that had been more or less possible in Mgr Dubourg's time became very difficult with his successor, Mgr Dubois, who was known to have been appointed by Pius XII precisely to counteract the modernist deviationism of the Diocese of Besançon, which had fallen prey to iconoclastic fantasies".

As far as ecumenism is concerned, there is as yet no specific secretariat. A first ecumenical event took place at the Liberation, on February 25, when Dubourg and Pastor Marchand held a joint service in memory of the victims of Nazism. In Belfort and Montbéliard, we can speak of popular ecumenism, born of the personalities of Abbé Jean Flory and Pastor Marchand, and of joint Catholic-Protestant actions during the Resistance. On the press front, l'Éclair Comtois was not taken over, but a truly diocesan weekly appeared, Cité Fraternelle, with a circulation of 23,000 copies. Between 1956 and 1960, the Besançon archdiocese saw only 112 priestly ordinations, leading Dubourg to warn the faithful of the risks this trend could entail if confirmed. It's true that religious congregations inaugurated annual diocesan congresses in 1952, with between three and five hundred participants. But their novitiates had only 163 entries from 1952 to 1956. This was half the number for the period 1927-1935. However, the number of priests donated by the Bisontin diocese to the French Catholic Church and Catholic Missions increased considerably: the Ordo donated 150 in 1938, 340 in 1953. Abbé Roussel-Gall founded the Travailleuses missionnaires de l'Immaculée Conception; Brother Léon Taverdet became Prior General of the Frères missionnaires des campagnes; Abbé Morel was a friend of the greatest artists of the day, and helped to make painter Georges Rouault known in France and elsewhere.

=== End of life ===
Dubourg spent his last days in the company of Abbé Florin Callerand, who advised him to continue the work begun at the Villa Saint-Charles de Gouille: "Go and look at the Roche d'Or: it's sunny there", alluding to the sunshine enjoyed by the Bisontine hill of the same name. Abbé Florin Callerand followed his advice and bought a ten-room house on the same hill in 1954. Maurice Dubourg died in the early hours of Sunday, just a few days before the celebrations planned for his episcopal jubilee. Although the planned procession through the streets of Besançon could not take place due to the exceptionally bitter cold, his death was greeted by a "triumphal funeral": In attendance were two cardinals, NNSS Feltin and Gerlier, respectively archbishops of Paris and Lyon, some twenty bishops, the Minister of Veterans and Victims of War, André Mutter, who had flown in (he had placed the tie of Commandeur de la Légion d'honneur on the coffin), a dozen members of parliament, a general, two prefects, countless mayors, and over a thousand priests and religious. Cardinal Feltin, former parish priest of Besançon's Sainte-Madeleine Church and a fellow Comtois, delivered the funeral oration in Besançon's Saint-Jean Cathedral. Georges Béjot conducted the mourning, with two clerics and four laymen (Messrs Georges Pernot, Saglio, Regani and Faivre) holding the cords. His death marked the end of an era for Catholicism in Franche-Comté, as well as for the Catholic Church in France. Dubourg's body rests in the votive monument of Notre-Dame de la Libération. The inscription at the foot of the statue reads: "1878 - 1954. Ici repose s. Maurice Dubourg, Archbishop of Besançon".

== Notre-Dame de la Libération ==
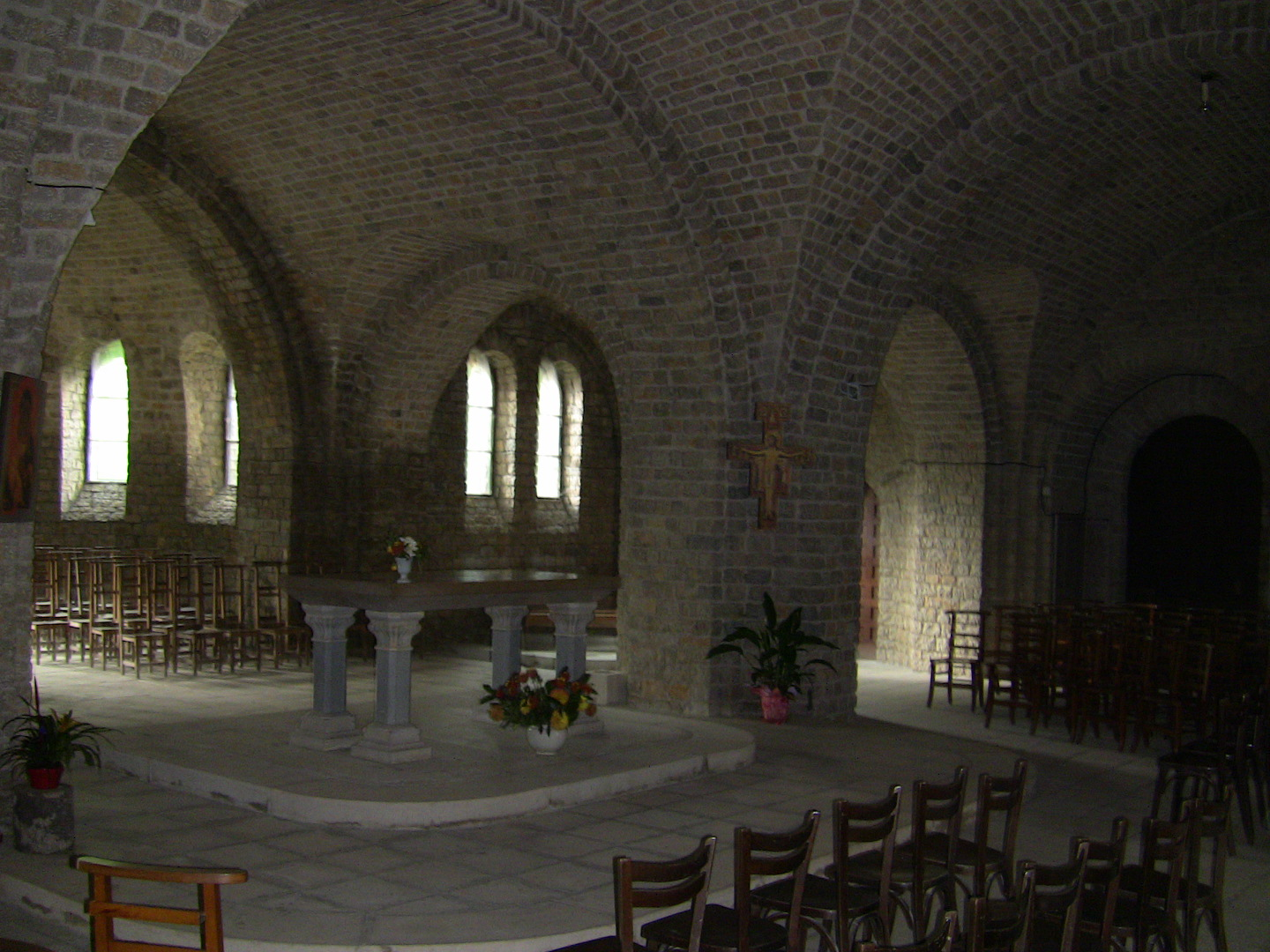
Inside the crypt

The Church of Notre-Dame de la Libération is a Catholic place of worship built on the summit of the colline des Bois, overlooking the city of Besançon (Doubs) at an altitude of nearly five hundred meters. The church was consecrated in the aftermath of the Second World War by Dubourg, after the Comtois capital had been spared bombardment. Subsequently, commemorative plaques lining the walls of the building and paying tribute to the diocesans and all the inhabitants of Besançon who died in the Second World War were added, as was a monumental seven-metre-high statue sculpted by Henri-Paul Rey.

== Decorations ==
- Chevalier de la Legion of Honor (decree of June 21, 1916)
- Commander of the Legion of Honor (decree of January 23, 1954)
- Croix de guerre 1914-1918, bronze star

== Publications ==
- Des peines en matière de justice militaire, doctoral thesis, Droit, Paris, Libr. nouvelle de droit et de jurisprudence, 1903, 274 p.
- Les retraites ouvrières: état actuel de la question en France et à l'étranger. Published by the Office Social du Sillon. Au Sillon, 31, Boulevard Raspail, Paris 7e, 1904, 78 p.
- L'État héritier, Faculté de droit de l'Université de Paris, Bonvalot-Jouve imprint, 1907, 152 p.
- Les Tombes de nos soldats : allocution prononcée à la cérémonie du Souvenir français, le 20 janvier 1918, à la cathédrale de Besançon, Impr. de l'Est, Besançon, 1918, 12 p.
- Aux Français de 20 ans : sixième et neuvième commandements : entretiens d'un aumônier avec un soldat de la grande Guerre, impr. Jacques et Demontrond, Besançon, 1919, 1923, X-94 p.
- Après la vingtième année : lettres à un jeune homme, Marseille, Publiroc, 1930, XII-229 p.
- Pastoral letter from the Archbishop of Besançon, on the occasion of his inauguration, Impr. catholique de l'Est, Besançon, 1937, 14 p.
- Pastoral letter from the Archbishop of Besançon on religious instruction for the persevering, 1937.
- Pastoral letter from the Archbishop of Besançon on the sacrament and virtue of penance, 1940.
- Pastoral letter from the Archbishop of Besançon on the parish, 1941.
- Regards sur le Ministère sacerdotal. Conférences à mes séminaristes, Cart, Besançon, 1942. In-8°, 318 p.
- Catechism. Diocèse de Besançon, Jacques et Demontrond, Besançon, 1943, 443 p.
- Lettre-circulaire au clergé du diocèse, Archevêché de Besançon, 1945, 5 p.
- Pastoral letter from the Archbishop of Besançon on Youth, 1945.
- "Allocution prononcée aux obsèques de Mgr Charles Ginisty", in À la mémoire de Mgr Charles Ginisty : évêque de Verdun, 1914-1946, letter from Mgr Petit to the clergy and faithful of his diocese on the death and funeral of Mgr Ginisty.
- Pastoral letter from the Archbishop of Besançon on the Christian community, 1947.
- Pastoral letter from the Archbishop of Besançon on liturgical life: and Mandement for Lent in the year of grace 1948, Impr. de l'Est, Besançon, 1948, 24 p.
- Patronage sportif bisontin : encouragements et consignes de Mgr Maurice Dubourg, Impr. de l'Est, Besançon, 1949, 32 p.
- Pastoral letter from the Archbishop of Besançon on the Virgin Mary in our lives, Impr. de l'Est, Besançon, February 18, 1949, 23 p.
- Pastoral letter from the Archbishop of Besançon on the laity in the Church, Impr. de l'Est, Besançon, 1950, 22 p.
- Pastoral letter from the Archbishop of Besançon on the Eucharist and us, Impr. de l'Est, Besançon, February 2, 1951.
- Constitutions et directoire des Sœurs des Saints Noms de Jésus et de Marie, religieuses gardes-malades : la Marne, Montferrand-le-Château, Impr. de l'Est, Besançon, 1952, VI-118 p.
- The Teaching Family: Pastoral Letter, Impr. de l'Est, Besançon, 1952, 20 p.
- Funeral oration for H.E. Mgr Gabriel Piguet: delivered by H.E. Mgr Dubourg, in Clermont Cathedral, le 29 octobre 1952, Impr. régionale, Clermont-Ferrand, 1952, 19 p.
- Pastoral letter from the Archbishop of Besançon on the pastoral care of students in public schools, 1952.
- Pastoral letter from the Archbishop of Besançon on Christians facing the misery of our times, Impr. de l'Est, Besançon, 1953, 20 p.
- Pastoral letter from the Archbishop of Besançon on Free Education, 1953.
