= Marseille Cathedral =

Roman Catholic cathedral in France

Cathedral of Saint Mary Major Notre-Dame-de-la-Major
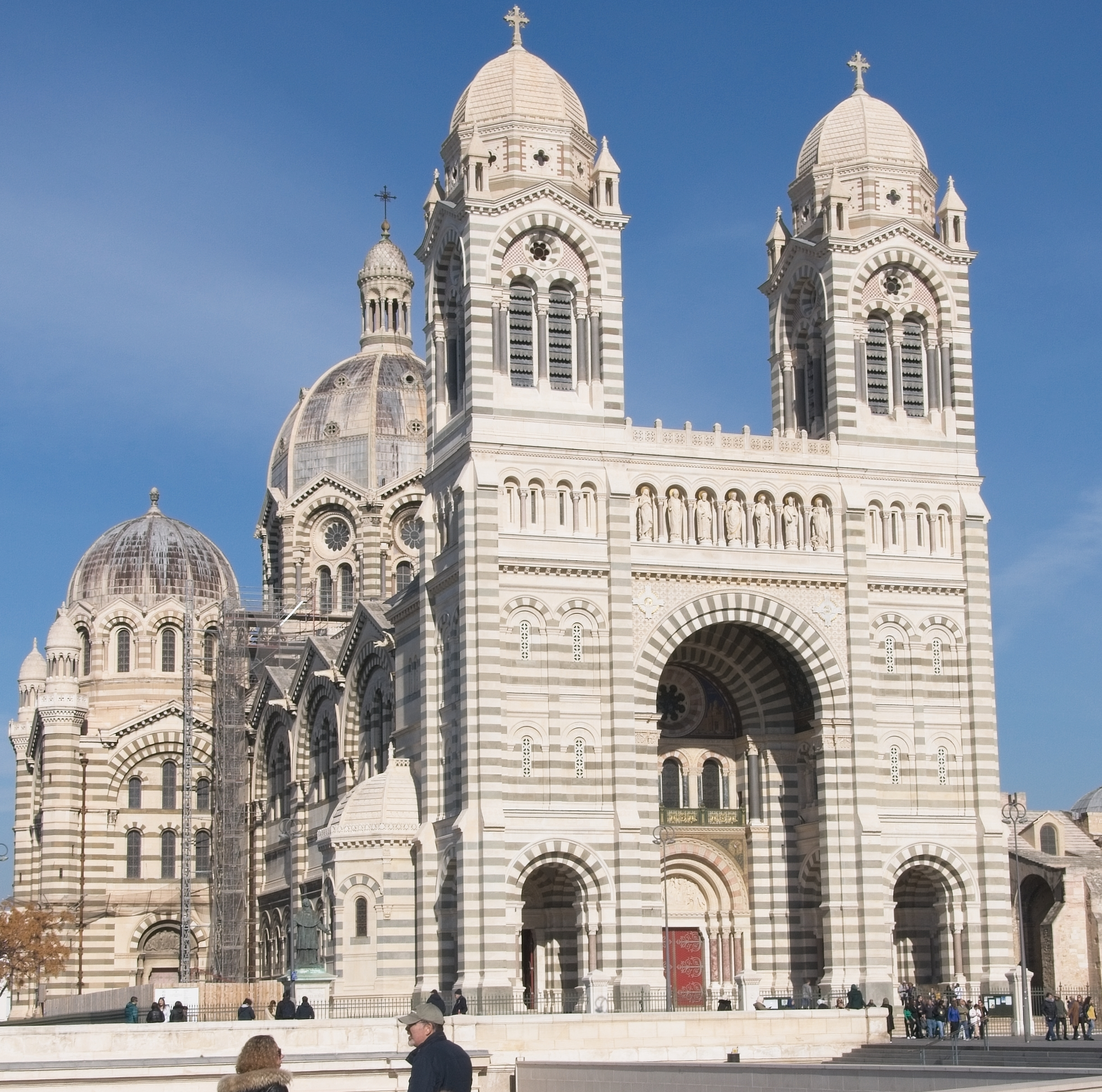
- Façade of the cathedral in 2023

Religion
- Affiliation: Roman Catholic
- Diocese: Archdiocese of Marseille
- Rite: Roman
- Ecclesiastical or organisational status: Cathedral

Location
- Location: Marseille, France
- Interactive map of Cathedral of Saint Mary Major; Notre-Dame-de-la-Major
- Coordinates: 43°17′59″N 5°21′54″E

Architecture
- Type: Church
- Style: Romanesque (old cathedral); Romanesque-Byzantine Revival (new cathedral)

Marseille Cathedral (French: Cathédrale Notre-Dame-de-la-Major or Cathédrale de La Major or simply La Major; Occitan: Catedrala Nòstra Dòna de la Major) is a Roman Catholic cathedral and a national monument of France. Located in Marseille, it has been a basilica minor since 1896. It is the seat of the Archdiocese of Marseille (the Diocese of Marseille until its elevation in 1948).

== Old cathedral ==
Part of the earlier, much smaller, cathedral still remains, alongside the newer one. It was built in the 12th century in a simple Romanesque style. Two bays of the nave were demolished in the 1850s, when the new cathedral was built. What remains is the choir and one bay of the nave, and these remaining parts are commonly referred to as the "Vieille Major". The composer Charles Desmazures was organist at the old cathedral.

== Present cathedral ==
The "Nouvelle Major" was built on an enormous scale in the Byzantine and Roman Revival styles. The foundation stone was laid by Emperor Napoleon III in 1852, and the first service was held in 1893. It was completed in 1896, given the title of minor basilica, and consecrated in 1897. It was built on the site used for the cathedrals of Marseille since the 5th century, principally by the architects Léon Vaudoyer and Henri-Jacques Espérandieu (1829-1874). It is 142 m (469 ft) long, and the main cupola is 70 m (231 ft) high. With a capacity of 3,000 seats, it is one of the largest cathedrals in France, covering a total of 7,680 square metres. It has been a listed monument since 1906.

== Gallery ==
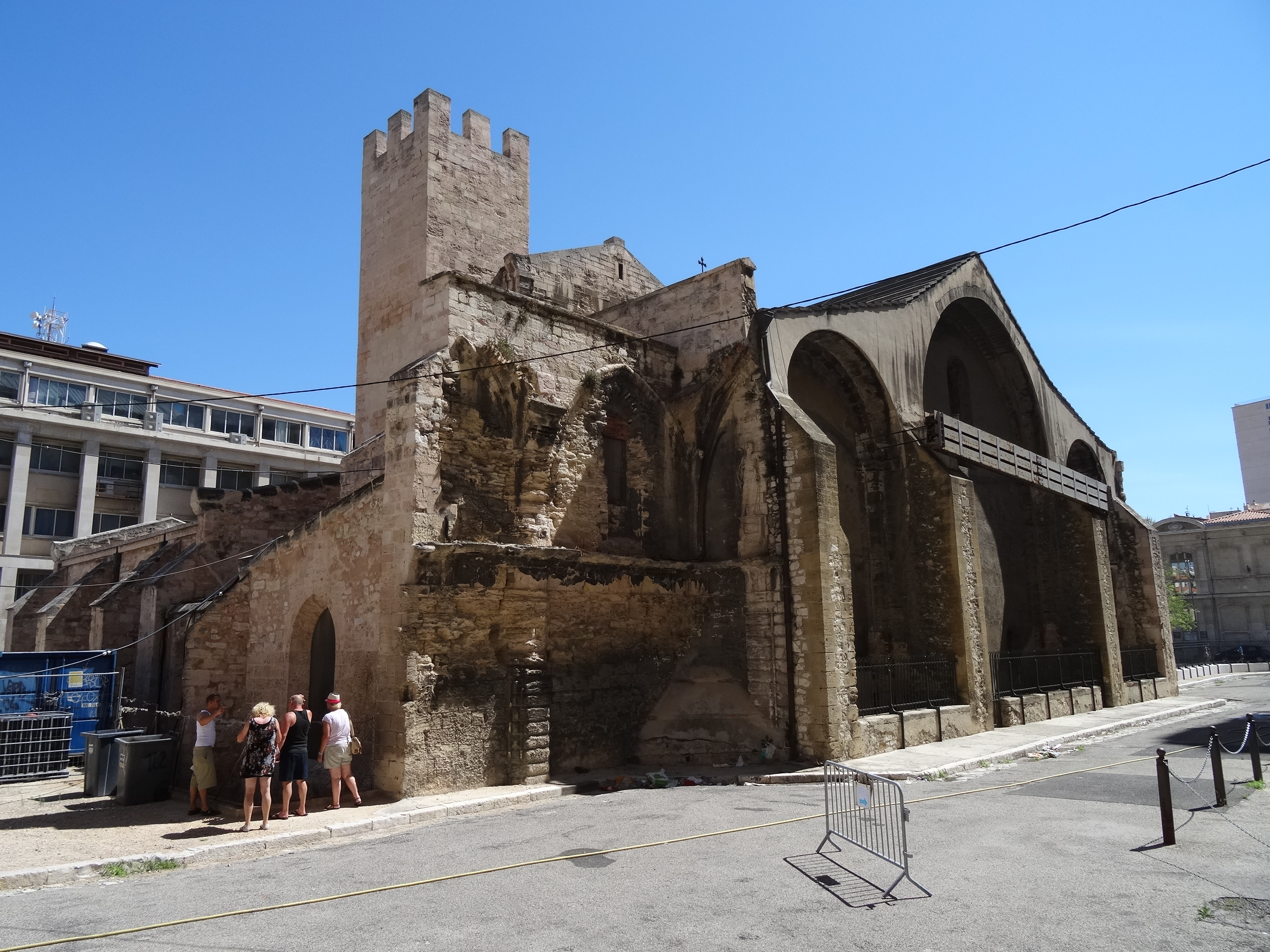
The old cathedral

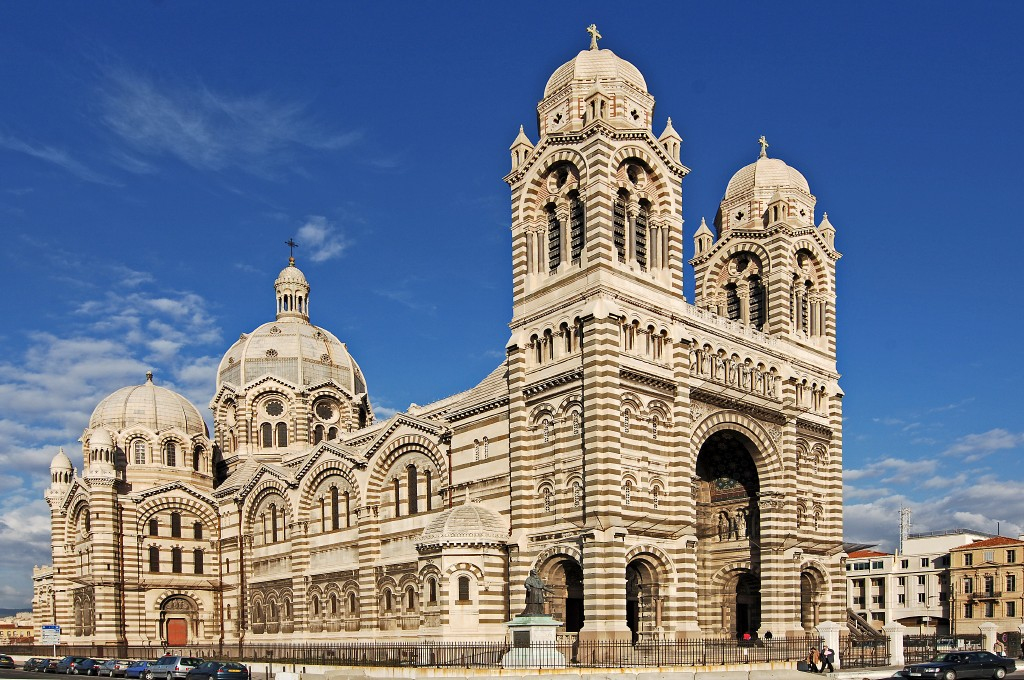
The cathedral in 2006

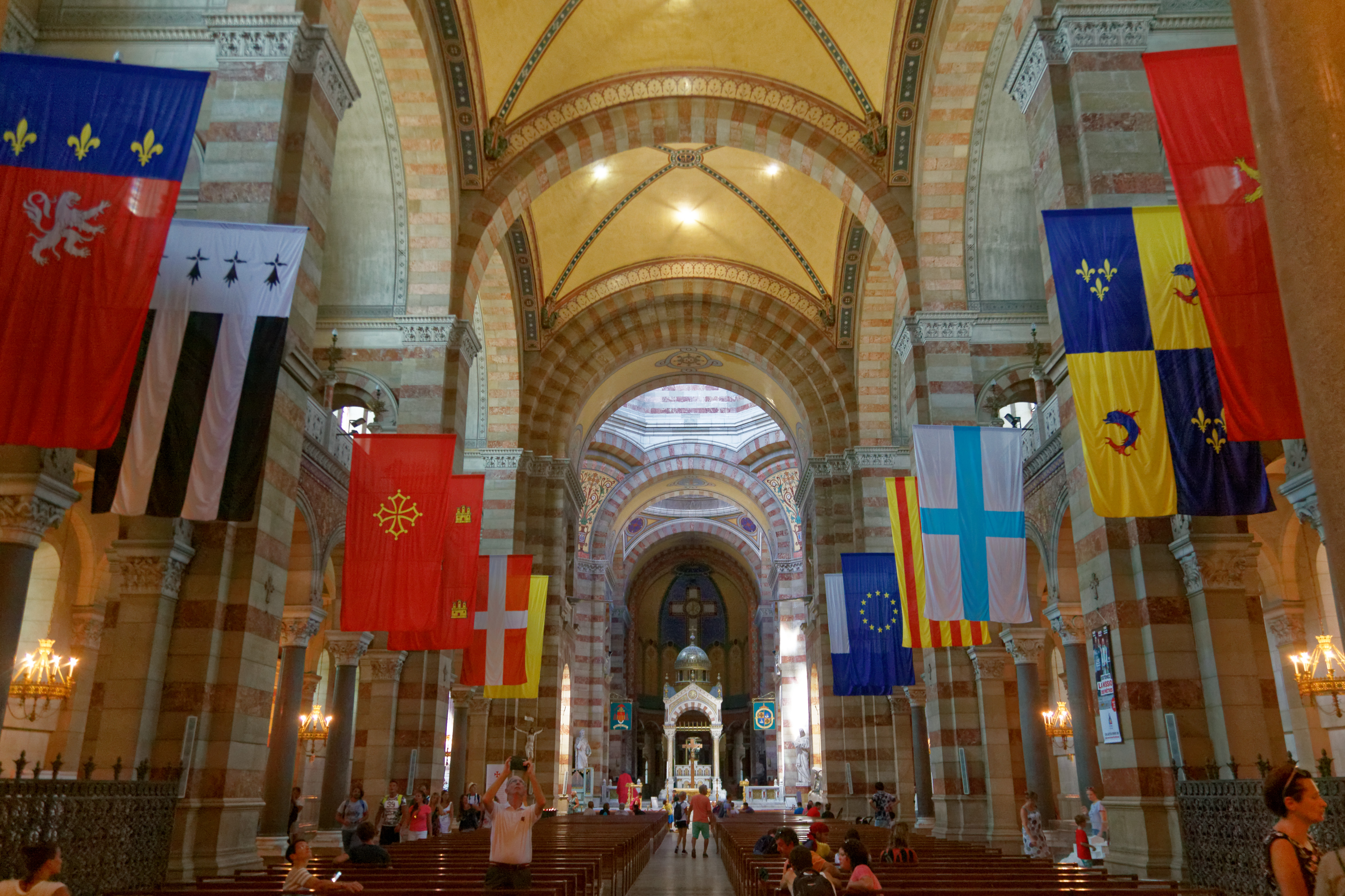
Interior

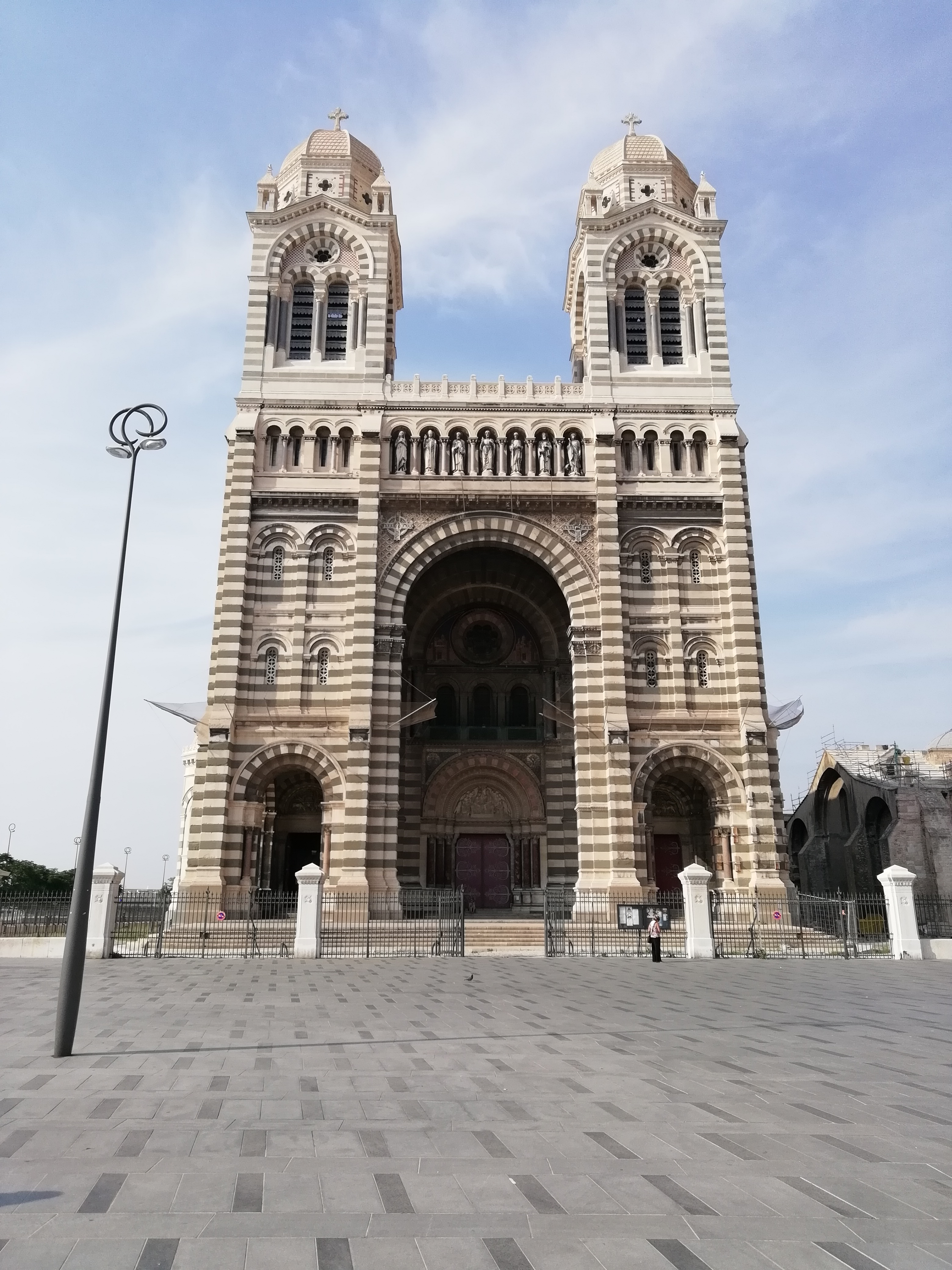
Facade

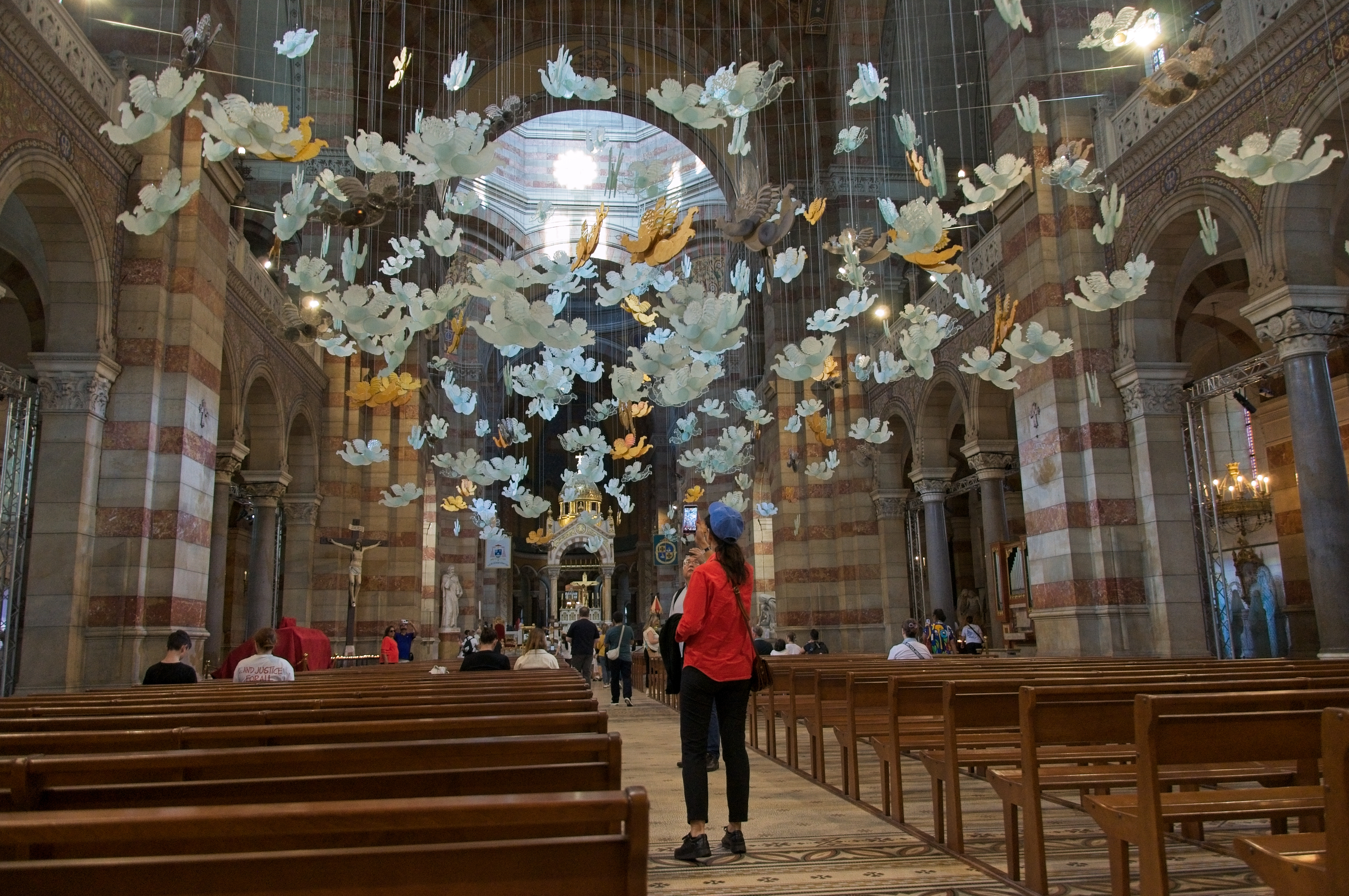
Marcoville's winter 2025–2026 exhibition

== See also ==
- This cathedral should not be confused with the more famous basilica of Notre-Dame de la Garde, also in Marseille.
- List of works by Eugène Guillaume
- List of works by Louis Botinelly
- Maurice Dubourg
