= Andrew Wilkie (disambiguation) =

Andrew Wilkie (born 1961) is an Australian politician, soldier, intelligence officer, and environmental activist.

Andrew Wilkie may also refer to:

- Andrew Wilkie (geneticist) (born 1953), English clinical professor of pathology
- Andrew Wilkie (zoo director) (1853–1948), director of the Melbourne Zoo
