= PLOS Genetics =

- Discipline: Genetics
- Language: English
- Edited by: Aimée Dudley, and Anne Goriely

Publication details
- History: 2005–present
- Publisher: Public Library of Science
- Frequency: Monthly
- Open access: Yes
- License: Creative Commons Attribution License
- Impact factor: 3.7 (2024)

Standard abbreviations
- ISO 4: PLoS Genet.

Indexing
- CODEN: PGLEB5
- ISSN: 1553-7390 (print); 1553-7404 (web)
- LCCN: 2004216451
- OCLC no.: 57175564

Links
- Journal homepage; Online access; Online archive

PLOS Genetics is a peer-reviewed open access scientific journal established in 2005 and published by the Public Library of Science. The founding editor-in-chief was Wayne N. Frankel (Columbia University Medical Center). The current editors-in-chief are Aimée Dudley (Pacific Northwest Research Institute) and Anne Goriely (MRC Weatherall Institute of Molecular Medicine). The journal covers research on all aspects of genetics and genomics.

== Abstracting and indexing ==
The journal is abstracted and indexed in:

- AGRICOLA
- Biological Abstracts
- BIOSIS Previews
- CAB Abstracts
- Chemical Abstracts Service
- Current Contents/Life Sciences
- EBSCO databases
- Embase
- Index Medicus/MEDLINE/PubMed
- Science Citation Index
- Scopus
- The Zoological Record

According to the Journal Citation Reports, the journal has a 2020 impact factor of 5.917.

== Research Prize ==
Since its tenth year of publication, the journal annually awards the $5000 PLOS Genetics Research Prize for the best paper published in the previous year based on nominations from members of the genetics community.
