= Stephen Bloom =

Stephen Bloom may refer to:

- Stephen G. Bloom (born 1951), American journalist and professor of journalism
- Stephen R. Bloom (born 1942), British professor of medicine
- Stephen Bloom (politician) (born 1961), member of the Pennsylvania House of Representatives
