= Pierre Molères =

French Roman Catholic bishop (born 1932)

His Excellency Pierre Molères
- Bishop Emeritus of Bayonne, Lescar and Oloron
- Church: Catholic Church
- Diocese: Diocese of Bayonne
- Appointed: 13 June 1986
- Term ended: 15 October 2008
- Predecessor: Jean-Paul Vincent
- Successor: Marc Aillet
- Previous post: Coadjutor Bishop of Bayonne (1986)

Orders
- Ordination: 14 April 1962
- Consecration: 2 March 1986 by Jean-Paul Vincent

Personal details
- Born: Pierre Jean Marie Marcel Molères; 21 November 1932 (age 93) Dax, Landes, France
- Motto: Agnum diligendo, fratres confirmare
- Coat of arms

Pierre Jean Marie Marcel Molères (born 21 November 1932) is a French Roman Catholic prelate who served as Bishop of Bayonne, Lescar and Oloron from 1986 to 2008.

== Early life and education ==
Molères was born in Dax, Landes, on 21 November 1932. He studied literature at the University of Poitiers and at the Sorbonne before entering ecclesiastical formation. He subsequently attended the Pius XI Seminary in Toulouse and the Carmes Seminary in Paris and pursued studies at the Catholic Institutes of Toulouse and Paris.

== Priesthood ==
Molères was ordained to the priesthood for the Diocese of Aire and Dax on 14 April 1962. He later served in pastoral ministry and diocesan responsibilities within the diocese.

== Episcopal ministry ==
Pope John Paul II appointed Molères coadjutor bishop of Bayonne, Lescar and Oloron on 21 January 1986.

He received episcopal consecration on 2 March 1986 from Bishop Jean-Paul Vincent, and succeeded as Bishop of Bayonne, Lescar and Oloron on 13 June 1986.

He led the diocese for more than twenty-two years, serving the Catholic communities of the French Basque Country and Béarn. At the end of his episcopate, the Bishops' Conference of France highlighted his long pastoral service.

Pope Benedict XVI accepted his resignation on 15 October 2008 upon reaching the canonical retirement age. He was succeeded by Marc Aillet and became bishop emeritus of the diocese.

== Later life ==
As bishop emeritus, Molères has continued to participate in diocesan and liturgical events. In April 2025, he took part in Palm Sunday celebrations at Morlanne in the Pyrénées-Atlantiques department. Molères later published his memoirs recounting his episcopal experience in the Basque Country.
