= Goriely =

Goriely is a surname. Notable people with the surname include:

- Alain Goriely, Belgian mathematician
- Anne Goriely, British geneticist
