= Bayonne Cathedral =

French Catholic Church in Pyrénées-Atlantiques

Coordinates: 43°29′26″N 1°28′38″W

Bayonne Cathedral Cathédrale Notre-Dame de Bayonne
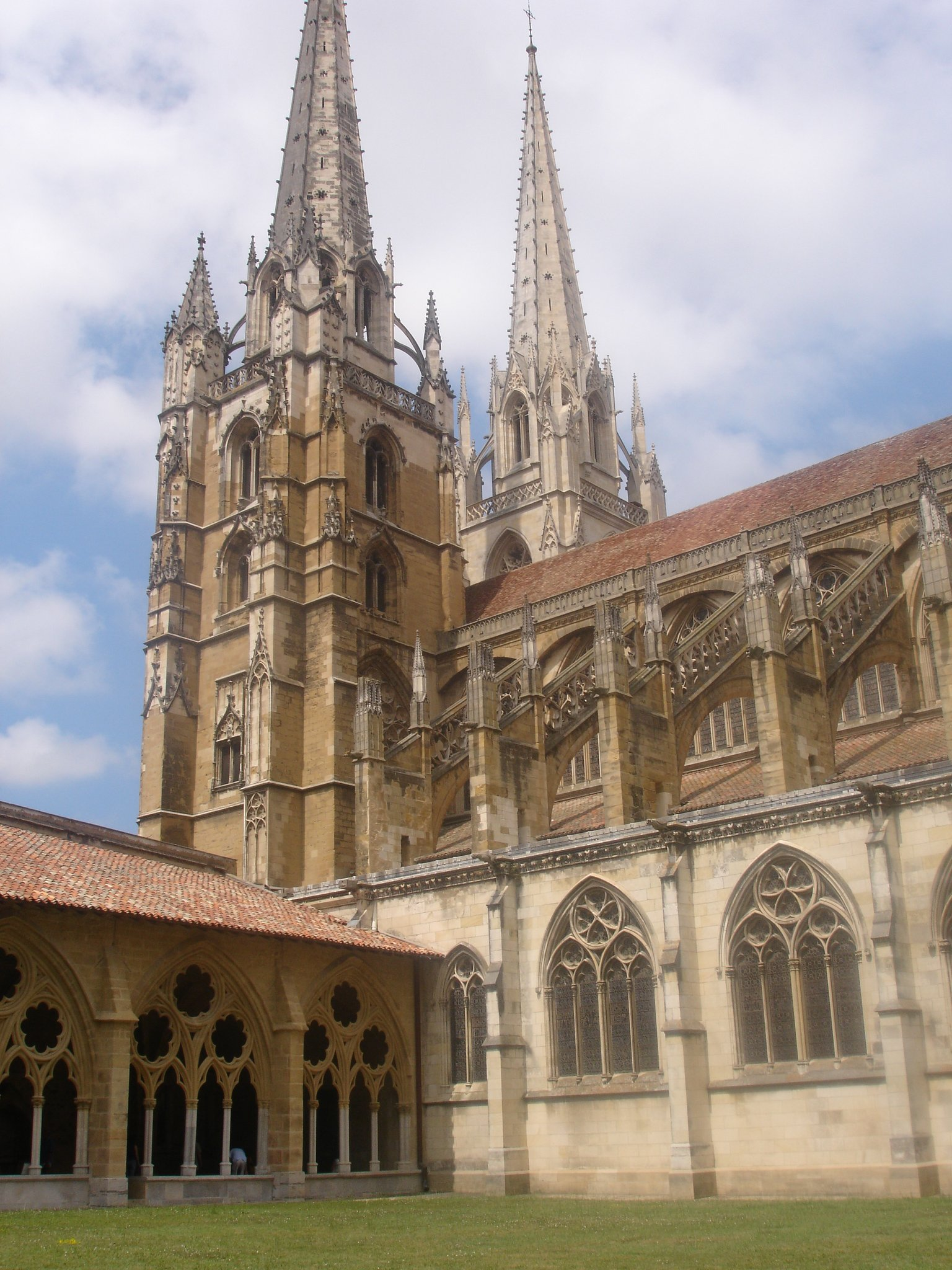
- Bayonne Cathedral

Religion
- Affiliation: Roman Catholic Church
- Province: Bishop of Bayonne
- Region: Pyrénées-Atlantiques
- Rite: Roman
- Ecclesiastical or organisational status: Cathedral
- Status: Active

Location
- Location: Bayonne, France
- Interactive map of Bayonne Cathedral; Cathédrale Notre-Dame de Bayonne

Architecture
- Type: church
- Style: Gothic
- Groundbreaking: 13th century
- Completed: 19th century

Specifications
- Length: 33.40 m (109.6 ft)
- Width: 76.96 m (252.5 ft)

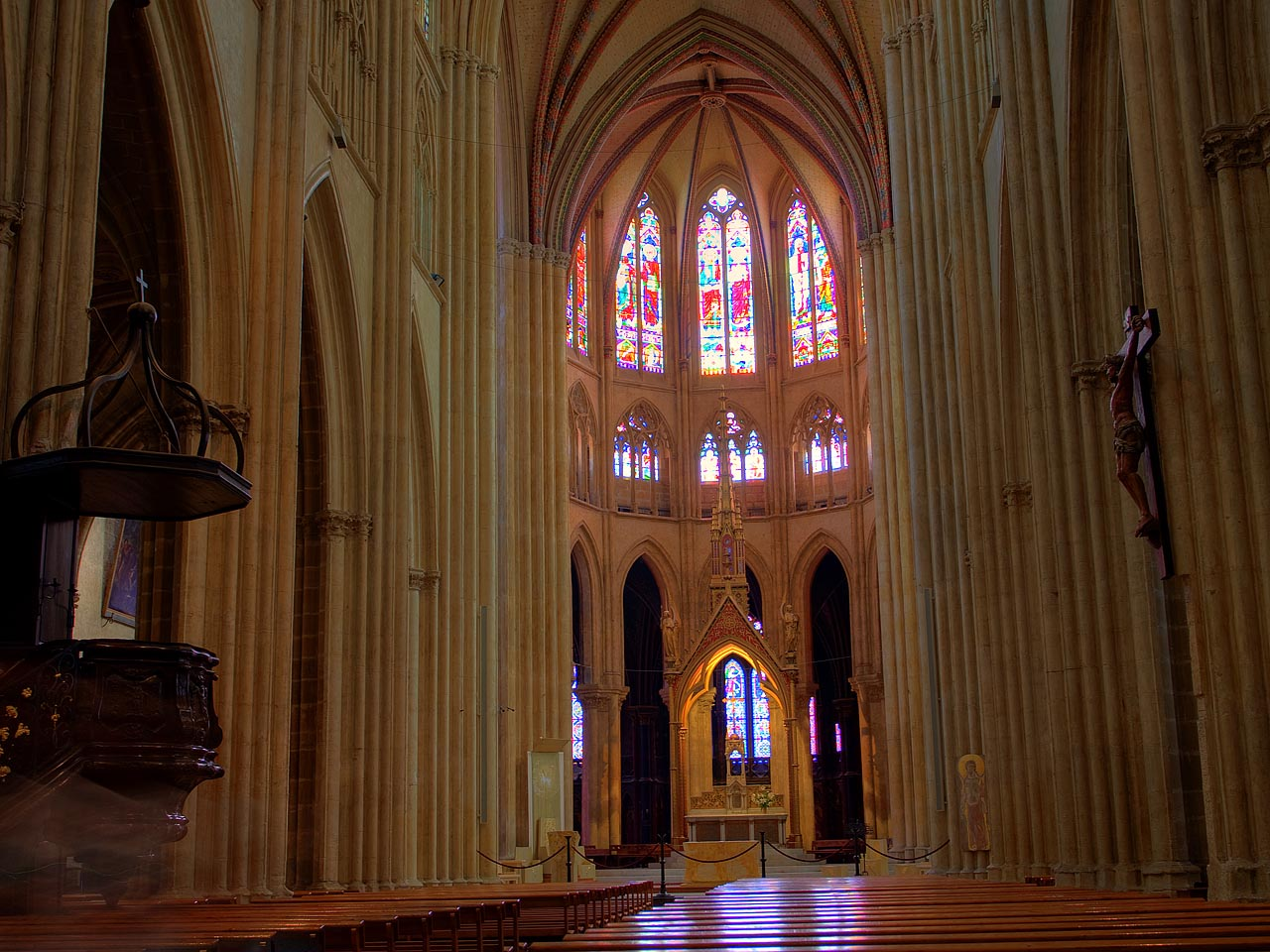
Interior - Bayonne Cathedral

The Cathedral of Saint Mary of Bayonne or the Cathedral of Our Lady of Bayonne (French: Cathédrale Sainte-Marie de Bayonne or Cathédrale Notre-Dame de Bayonne; Basque: Santa Maria katedrala or Andre Maria katedrala), commonly known as Bayonne Cathedral, is a Roman Catholic church in the town of Bayonne, France. It is the seat of the former Bishops of Bayonne, now the Bishops of Bayonne, Lescar, and Oloron. The cathedral is in the Gothic architectural tradition.

The site was previously occupied by a Romanesque cathedral that was destroyed by two fires in 1258 and 1310. Construction of the present cathedral began in the 13th century and was completed at the beginning of the 17th, except for the two spires which were not finished until the 19th century. The structure has been much restored and refurbished, notably by Émile Boeswildwald, architect to the French government in the 19th century, and a pupil of Eugène Viollet-le-Duc.

The cathedral contains the relics of Saint Leo of Bayonne, a 9th-century Bishop of Bayonne and evangelizer of the Basque Country. The cathedral stands on the Pilgrimage Way of Santiago de Compostela and, as part of the Routes of Santiago de Compostela in France, has been added to the UNESCO World Heritage List in 1998.

== Bells ==
The north tower (left tower) houses a ring of 5 bells.

- Jacques (the bourdon): La 2 - 3,640 kg, cast in 2003 by the Cornille-Harvard bellfoundry in Villedieu-les-Poêles
- Marie: Do 3 - 2,100 kg, cast in 1819 by Jean Delestan, a bellfounder in Dax. This bell tolls the hours
- Léon: Mi 3 - 1,000 kg, cast in 1955 by the Paccard bellfoundry in Annecy. This bell strikes for the Angelus three times a day
- Christ Roi: Sol 3 – 650 kg, cast in 1955 by the Paccard bellfoundry in Annecy
- Jeanne d'Arc (Joan of Arc): La 3 – 460 kg, cast in 1955 by the Paccard bellfoundry in Annecy. This bell is called the "bell of the young people", and strikes on the quarter hours

The bourdon Jacques is an unusual bell. It was offered by the city of Bayonne and the French Government. Cast on the 11th of July 2003, it was baptised by Monseigneur Molères, bishop of Bayonne, on Saturday the 20th of September of that year, later to take its place in the belfry on October 1st.

Furthermore, it was lavishly decorated by Marc-Antoine Orellana.

For the body, the artist chose three symbolic elements: the cathedral and its cloister, a ship upon a tree of life, and the portal of the building.

For the crown, Orellana pays tribute to the magnificence of the New Jerusalem.

Jacques's uniqueness is therefore characterised by its polychromic nature, meaning that it was painted, making it one of the very few polychromic bells in France. The body was burnished by oxydation, giving a brown patina, and the symbols were colours with inks and pigments. Its yoke (the horizontal wooden piece on which the bell is fixed) is an asymmetrically sculpted oak piece incrusted with bronze and polychrome. Even its clapper is ornate.

Inscriptions read: "A tout âge, choisir d’aimer, en vérité" ("At any age, choose to love, truly").

Marc-Antoine Orellana had already been in charge of the bells of Notre-Dame de Grâce (Honfleur) in 1966. After his work in Bayonne, he later embellished the three bells of the church of Sainte-Jeanne de Chantal (Paris) in 2004, and then again in 2015, the three bells for Sées's cathedral.

As archeological remains found during the construction of the public library show, bells used to be cast in the city itself during the creation of the cathedral.

During medieval times, the bell tower was situated next to the chevet, close to the actual entry of the cloister. The bell ringer living in the belfry had access to both a vertical and an equinoctial sundial, which remains today. Nonetheless, as soon as 1595, the city ordered a clock for the bell tower of the cathedral.

== Bibliography ==
- Saint-Vanne, A. (1930). "La cathedrale de Bayonne". Bulletin trimestriel: Société des sciences, lettres, arts, et d'ėtudes regionales de Bayonne n.s. 5 (Bayonne 1930), pp. 10–51. (in French)
