= Alan Turnbull (scientist) =

British metrologists (born 1949)

Alan Turnbull OBE FRS FREng
- Born: 4 September 1949 (age 76); Glasgow, Scotland
- Education: University of Strathclyde; University of Bristol
- Awards: FRS (2013)
- Scientific career
- Fields: Corrosion engineering; Material science
- Workplaces: National Physical Laboratory
- Website: npl.co.uk/people/alan-turnbull

Alan Turnbull (born 4 September 1949) is a British corrosion scientist and engineer specialising in the measurement and modelling of environment-assisted cracking and the localised corrosion of metals. He is a Senior NPL Fellow in Electrochemistry at the National Physical Laboratory.

== Education ==
Turnbull received a Bachelor of Science degree from the University of Strathclyde in 1970. He completed his doctorate in 1974 at the University of Bristol.

== Research and career ==
Turnbull joined the Materials Division of the National Physical Laboratory in 1973, becoming a Fellow in 1989 and a Senior Fellow in 2011. He has developed integrated models for the generation, diffusion and trapping of hydrogen atoms in metals. Hydrogen accumulation modifies the properties of metals and can result in fracture. By controlling this process, engineers can reduce the likelihood of failure and extend the operating lifetime of metal systems used in oil and gas applications, power generation and hydrogen gas transport.

He has authored eight international industry standards.

=== Awards and honours ===
Turnbull has received awards from the Institute of Corrosion, the European Federation of Corrosion and NACE International. He was elected a Fellow of the Royal Academy of Engineering in 2011 and a Fellow of the Royal Society (FRS) in 2013.

In 2016, he was appointed Order of the British Empire for services to science and industry.
