= Robert Young (materials scientist) =

British materials scientist

Robert Young FRS FREng FInstP FIMMM
- Born: Robert Joseph Young; 29 May 1948 (age 78)
- Education: University of Cambridge (MA, PhD)
- Awards: Leslie Holliday Prize (2011); Swinburne Medal (2012)
- Scientific career
- Fields: Materials science; Polymer science
- Workplaces: National Graphene Institute; University of Manchester; University of Manchester Institute of Science and Technology
- Thesis: Deformation mechanism in crystalline polymers (1972)
- Website: research.manchester.ac.uk/portal/robert.young.html

Robert Joseph Young FRS (born 29 May 1948) is a British materials scientist specialising in polymers and composites. He is Emeritus Professor of Polymer Science and Technology at the Department of Materials and National Graphene Institute at the University of Manchester.

== Education ==
Young was educated at St John's College, Cambridge, where he received his Master of Arts and Doctor of Philosophy degrees.

== Research and career ==
Young has published over 330 research papers which have been cited over 37,000 times, leading to a h-index of 91. He is known for research on the relationships between the structure and mechanical properties of polymers and composites. A particular focus of his work has been the study of how materials such as carbon fibres and spider silk deform at the molecular level. He has also studied carbon-fibre composites, carbon nanotubes and the deformation of graphene — a one-atom thick sheet of carbon. Among his work on polymer-graphene composites, one important result elucidated for the first time the relationship between composite reinforcement and matrix modulus.

In his research, Young made a novel use of Raman spectroscopy. In this technique, laser light is shone onto a material and the wavelength and intensity of the resulting scattered light is measured and analysed. The changes in the light relate to changes in bond length between the atoms of the molecules in the material when the material is deformed.

He has also co-authored the widely used textbook: Introduction to Polymers.

=== Awards and honours ===
Young received the 2011 Leslie Holliday Prize and the 2012 Swinburne Medal from the Institute of Materials, Minerals and Mining, and delivered the Swinburne Lecture in 2013. He was elected a Fellow of the Royal Society (FRS) in 2013. His certificate of election reads:

Robert Young is one of the world's foremost scientists and his innovative research has transformed our understanding of the relationships between structure and mechanical properties in polymers and composites. He has developed a theoretical framework to describe the role of dislocations in the plastic deformation of semi-crystalline polymers and identified new toughening mechanisms. He subsequently pioneered the use of Raman spectroscopy to study deformation micromechanics in fibres at the molecular level. He has demonstrated that this approach can be extended to the deformation of carbon-nanotubes and graphene nano-composites and has proven that continuum mechanics is still applicable at the nano-scale
