= Marc Aillet =

Bishop of Bayonne

His Excellency Marc Aillet
- Bishop of Bayonne
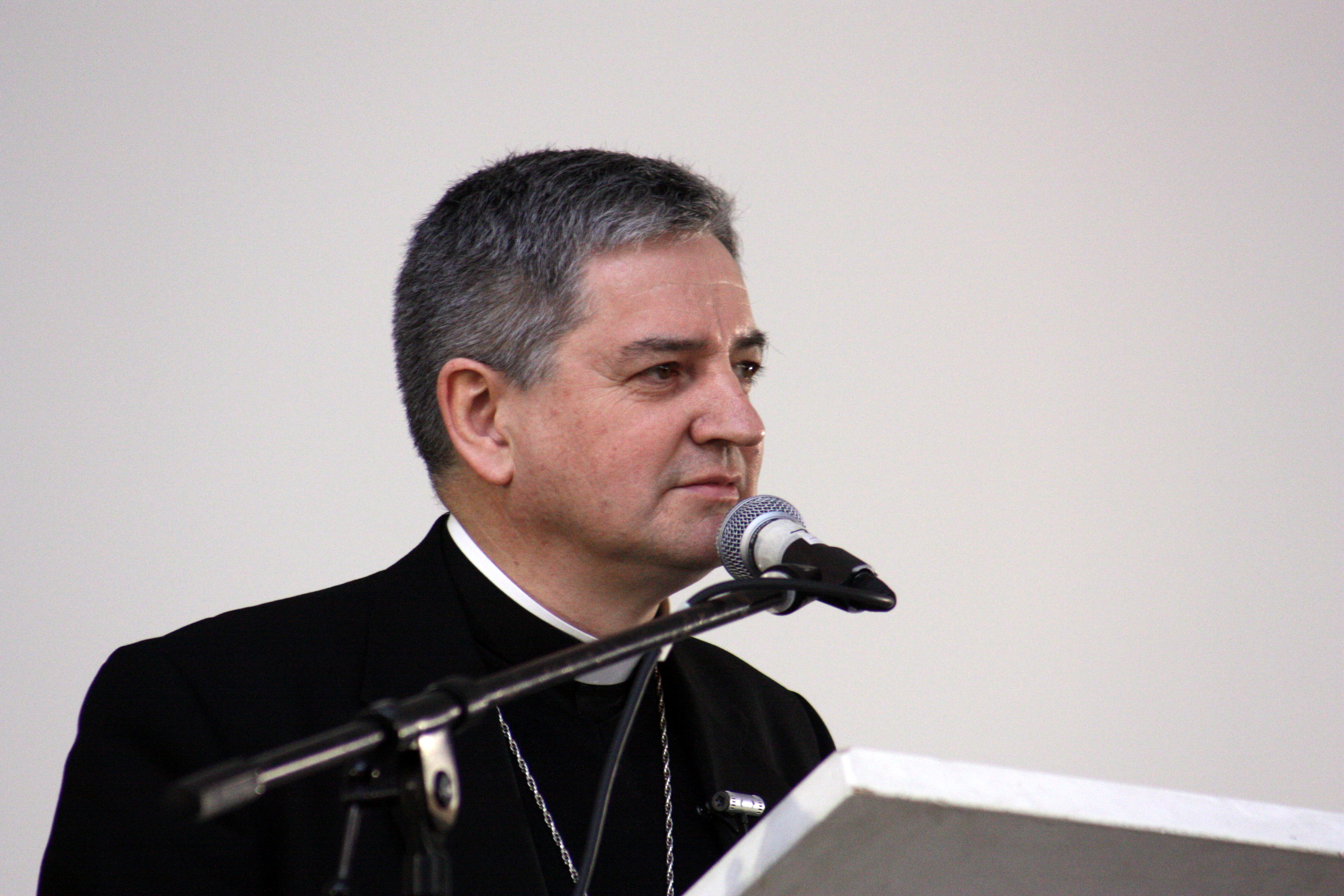
- Church: Roman Catholic Church
- Diocese: Diocese of Bayonne
- Installed: 15 October 2008
- Predecessor: Pierre Molères

Orders
- Ordination: 3 July 1982 by Giuseppe Siri
- Consecration: 30 November 2008 by Jean-Pierre Ricard

Personal details
- Born: 17 April 1957 (age 69) Parakou, French Dahomey

Styles of Marc Aillet
- Reference style: The Most Reverend
- Spoken style: Your Excellency
- Religious style: Monsignor
- Posthumous style: not applicable

Marc Marie Max Aillet (born 17 April 1957) is a French Roman Catholic prelate, who has been the bishop of Bayonne since 30 November 2008. He had previously served as vicar general of the diocese of Fréjus-Toulon.

== Biography ==
Aillet was born in 1957 in Parakou, present day Benin. He studied classics in Paris. He entered the Medicine faculty for a year before entering the major seminary in Genoa. He was ordained a priest on 3 July 1982 for the diocese of Genoa by Cardinal Giuseppe Siri.

He was a student at the University of Fribourg, where he completed a licence and a doctorate (1989) in moral theology with a thesis entitled: "Lire la Bible avec saint Thomas – Le passage de la "lettera" à la "res" dans la Somme Théologique" (English: "Reading the Bible with Saint Thomas — The passage from 'lettera' to 'res' in the Summa Theologiae").

He returned to France where he was incardinated in the diocese of Fréjus-Toulon and where he worked as a chaplain at the college of Saint-Raphaël. He served as a professor of moral theology in the major seminary of Toulon from 1985 to 1992. After this, he was responsible for the formation of seminarians in the diocese of Blois. He served as parish priest of Saint-Raphaël from 1998 to 2002 and, beginning in 2001, served as an episcopal vicar and, from 2002, vicar general of the diocese of Fréjus-Toulon. He was elected Cathedral canon in 2003.

He was appointed as the bishop of Bayonne by Pope Benedict on 15 October 2008 and was consecrated and installed on 30 November 2008 with Cardinal Jean-Pierre Ricard, archbishop of Bordeaux as his Principal Consecrator with Bishop Pierre Jean Marie Marcel Molères and Bishop Dominique Marie Jean Rey of Fréjus-Toulon serving as the principal co-consecrators.

Bishop Aillet wished to increase the number of Tridentine Masses in his diocese and established a weekly Latin Mass in Bayonne. He celebrated ordinations in the church of Saint-Eloi, Bordeaux, the personal parish of the Institute of the Good Shepherd in January 2010.

== See also ==
- Catholic Church in France
- List of the Roman Catholic dioceses of France
- List of Bishops in France

Catholic Church titles
Preceded by Pierre Jean Marie Marcel Molères	Bishop of Bayonne; 30 November 2008–present	Succeeded by incumbent
