= Charles's Cross =

Middle Age boundary

In the Middle Ages, Charles's Cross (Latin: Crux Caroli Regis), high in the Pyrenees, marked the frontier between the Kingdom of Navarre and the Duchy of Gascony, specifically the boundary between the Diocese of Bayonne and the Diocese of Pamplona. It was located in the Col de Cize just north of Roncesvalles on the Way of Saint James.

== History ==
According to legend, owing primarily to the Liber peregrinationis of Aymeric Picaud, the cross was planted by Charlemagne when he first crossed the Pyrenees on his way to Zaragoza in 778. He reportedly said a prayer to Saint James at the site, thus inaugurating the cult of James in Spain some thirty six years before his relics were rediscovered. The first reference to a cross named after Charles is in an episcopal charter of Bayonne, dated 980. A bull of Pope Paschal II in 1106 refers to the limits of the French kingdom as the vallis que Cirsia dicitur usque Caroli crucem (valley called Cizes as far as Charles's cross). José María Lacarra (1907–1987) affirmed that the cross was originally only a diocesan boundary, of Carolingian provenance, and was associated with the Way of Saint James. The famous Spanish historian Ramón Menéndez Pidal argued that the cross was an important stage in the pilgrim's journey because it marked their entrance into Spain.

The cross named after Charles was in fact only one of many crosses, known as the croix bornales, that once marked the diocesan (and international) boundary in the Pyrenees between the eleventh and sixteenth centuries. Crosses sited near settlements were usually of stone. Those located further up in the mountains were usually of iron, because they were easier to transport and cheaper to manufacture. The ferrous landmarks explain the Basque toponym gurutzgorris and the Spanish cruces rojas, both meaning "red crosses".

In 1160 the Vézelay Chronicle recorded the cross as the southern boundary of the domain of Eleanor of Aquitaine when she married Louis VII of France. The twelfth-century Liber mentions not only the cross, but also the hospice called Rotolandus, Charlemagne's chapel, and the rock split by Durendal, the sword of Roland, and his tomb at Blaye. The cross is mentioned in Ralph of Diceto, who says that as a result of Richard I's campaigns in 1194 "from the castle of Verneuil until one arrives at Charles's Cross no rebels exist" (a castello Vernolii quousque veniatur ad crucem Karoli nullus ei rebellis existat). The Annales sancti Albini andegavensis (or Annales de Saint- Aubin) record that when John became king of England in 1199 he "acquired all the kingdom which was his father's as far as the cross of King Charles" (adquisivit totum regnum quod erat patris sui usque ad crucem Caroli regis).

== Location ==
Researchers have proposed various interpretations of the evidence for the cross's location for centuries. In 1637, the Basque Arnauld de Oihenart, in his Notitia utriusque Vasconie, concluded that Charles's Cross had occupied a site that was then under the chapel of San Salvador de Ibañeta. The Béarnais Pierre de Marca followed in him in this identification. Around the turn of the twentieth century, two canons of Bayonne, Victor Pierre Dubarat (1849–1912) and Jean-Baptiste Daranatz (1869–1937), wrote that in the twelfth century the site of San Salvador de Ibañeta had been covered by nothing but Charles's Cross and the thousands of other crosses placed there by pilgrims on the Way of Saint James. According to Lacarra, this conclusion is based on a misinterpretation of the Liber peregrinationis.

Other historians around the turn of the twentieth century placed the cross on the Roman road that passed through the mountains. The historian Jean de Jaurgain (1842–1920) believed the cross was located near Arnéguy and Valcarlos, and even identified it with the now lost "Capeyron Roge", in fact a pilgrim hospital. The historical cross which confused him was a diocesan marker, which he found labeled "Curutchegorry" on an eighteenth-century map. Louis Colas (1869–1929) was so convinced that Charlemagne had planted the cross atop the summit of Orzanzurieta, the highest peak in the region, when he repaired the road to Zaragoza, then he climbed the Pyrenees in search of its remains in 1910. The remains of a cross he did report, but these were shown to be the remains of a trigonometric column used by the military.

Others have differed in their readings of Aymeric Picaud. Piarres Narbaitz Caillava (1910–1984) denied that the cross could have been as high up as Colas suggested and still be accessible to pilgrims. He interpreted Picaud as saying it was in a "marvellous mount", which he identified with the Col de Cizes, but still on the Roman road. Pidal proposed the peak of Astobizcar, the highest point of the route through Lepoeder, but Jimeno Jurío demonstrated that this was a misreading of Picaud, who said not that the cross was located at the fastigium (highest point) but was visible from it in summitate eiusdem monti (on a lesser summit of its mountains).

A cross outside Roncesvalles was placed in the fifteenth century by a prior of the collegiate church.
