= Diocese of Bayonne =

Catholic diocese in France

Coordinates: 43°29′26″N 1°28′40″W

Diocese of Bayonne, Lescar, and Oloron Dioecesis Baionensis, Lascurrensis et Oloronensis: Diocèse de Bayonne, Lescar et Oloron; Baionako, Leskarreko eta Oloroeko elizbarrutia

Catholic
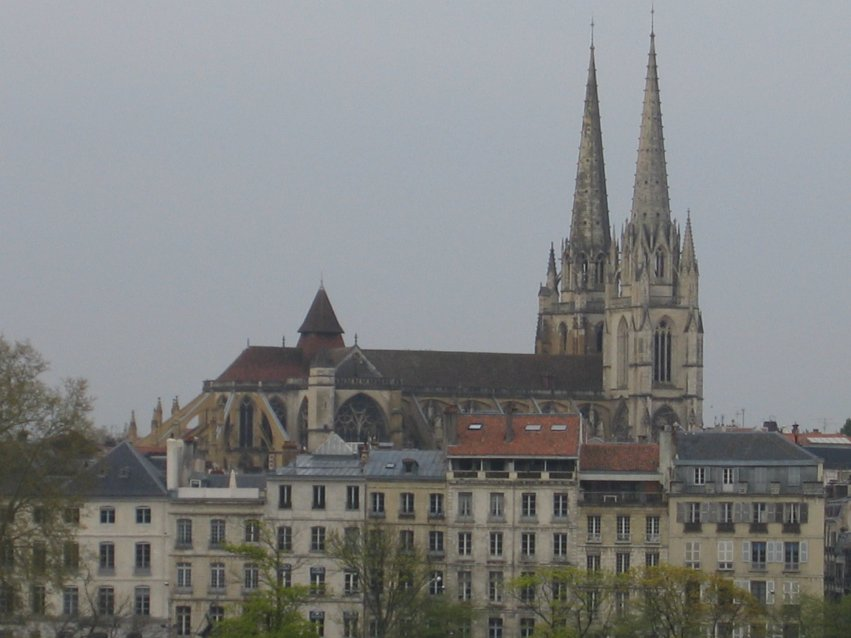
- Bayonne Cathedral

Location
- Country: France
- Ecclesiastical province: Bordeaux
- Metropolitan: Archdiocese of Bordeaux

Statistics
- Area: 7,644 km^{2} (2,951 sq mi)
- Population: Total; Catholics: (as of 2022); 697,000; 597,000 (est.) (85.7%)
- Parishes: 70

Information
- Denomination: Catholic Church
- Sui iuris church: Latin Church
- Rite: Roman Rite
- Established: United: 22 June 1909
- Cathedral: Cathedral of Notre Dame in Bayonne
- Patron saint: Blessed Virgin Mary Assumed in Heaven
- Secular priests: 221 (diocesan); 76 (religious Orders); 10 Permanent Deacons

Current leadership
- Pope: Leo XIV
- Bishop: Marc Aillet
- Metropolitan Archbishop: Jean-Paul James
- Bishops emeritus: Pierre Molères Bishop (1986-2008)

Map
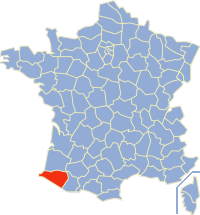
- Locator map of current diocese of Bayonne

Website
- Old diocesan web site; Current diocesan web site

The Diocese of Bayonne, Lescar, and Oloron, commonly Diocese of Bayonne, (Latin: Dioecesis Baionensis, Lascurrensis et Oloronensis; French: Diocèse de Bayonne, Lescar et Oloron; Basque: Baionako, Leskarreko eta Oloroeko elizbarrutia) is a Latin Church ecclesiastical territory or diocese of the Catholic Church in France. It is a suffragan diocese in the ecclesiastical province of the metropolitan Archdiocese of Bordeaux. The diocese comprises the département of Pyrénées-Atlantiques, in the région of Nouvelle-Aquitaine.

Its cathedral, the Cathédrale Notre-Dame in Bayonne is a World Heritage Site. Elsewhere in Aquitaine, the diocese contains two former cathedrals: the Ancienne cathédrale Notre-Dame de the Assumption, in Lescar; and the Ancienne cathédrale Sainte-Marie, in Oloron-Sainte-Marie.

== Diocesan borders ==
The southern boundary of the episcopal see, from the Carolingian period, was marked by a series of crosses high in the Pyrenees, of which the southernmost and most famous was Charles's Cross at Roncesvalles. The diocese of Bayonne gained much Spanish territory in 1030 from the Diocese of Pamplona: the four Archpresbyteries of Baztan, Lerin, Bortziria in Navarre and Hondarribia in Guipuzcoa, a remnant of Charlemagne's conquests beyond the Pyrenees.

In 1566, King Philip II of Spain, shocked and angry at the behavior of the Calvinist ruling family of Navarre, petitioned the Pope to save the Catholics on the south side of the Pyrenees by placing them for a time under the government of the bishop of Pamplona. The diocese of Bayonne, therefore, lost territory to the Diocese of Pamplona, by virtue of a papal bull of Pope Pius V of 30 April 1566.

On 29 November 1801, the Bull Qui Christi Domini, of Pope Pius VII abolished all the dioceses of France and then restored most of them along the lines of the pre-Revolutionary system, but with the boundaries established by the Constitutional Church, which approximated the boundaries of the new French civil departments. The diocese of Bayonne gained territories from the suppressed Diocese of Aire, Diocese of Dax, Diocese of Lescar, Diocese of Lombez, Diocese of Oloron, the Diocese of Saint-Bertrand-de-Comminges, and Diocese of Tarbes, which Pope Pius chose not to revive. Bayonne was a suffragan to the Archdiocese of Toulouse from 1802 to 1822.

After two decades, it was realized that the territory assigned to Bayonne in 1801 was too large for efficient administration by one bishop, and since Catholicism was making progress in Gascony against Protestantism, the diocese of Bayonne was subdivided on 6 October 1822, and it lost territory to the reestablished Diocese of Tarbes. Bayonne was suffragan to the Archdiocese of Auch from 1822 until 2002

On 22 June 1909 the diocese was assigned the titles of the Diocese of Lescar and the Diocese of Oloron, which had been suppressed in 1801. The change was purely honorific and antiquarian.

In the reorganization of the ecclesiastical structure of the Church in France, necessitated by accelerated urbanization and other changes in population, Pope John Paul II, on 8 December 2002, made Bayonne suffragan of the metropolitan archdiocese of Bordeaux.

== History ==
Local tradition maintains that Leo of Bayonne, the martyr, with whose memory is associated a miraculous fountain, was the first bishop of Bayonne; but Leo was a priest of the third quarter of the ninth century, and his hagiographies insist that he had been Archbishop of Rouen before being sent to Bayonne by Pope Gregory (IV) or a Pope Stephen to evangelize the territory. As Honoré Fisquet puts it succinctly, these lives have nothing really authentic in them.

No bishop is historically known prior to the eleventh century. Some scholars think, however, that the fact that the town of Lapurdum (which later came to be called Bayonne), was designated as civitas (Roman municipality) in the Treaty of Andelot (587), indicates that the civitas must have had a bishop at that time. That is just a conjecture. Others associate the foundation of the See of Bayonne with the establishment of the Kingdom of Aquitaine (778). That too is a conjecture. Louis Duchesne concludes that, in the present (1910) state of the documentary evidence, no solution presents itself.

Bishop Raymond III de Martres (1122–1125) was given half of the city of Bayonne by William IX, Duke of Aquitaine.

From 1152 to 1451 Bayonne was ruled by Eleanor of Aquitaine and her descendants, the kings of England. The royal coat of arms is to be found on one of the bosses in the vaulting of the choir of the Cathedral. In 1177, Richard, the son of Henry II of England and Eleanor of Aquitaine, made war in Gascony, besieged Dax and its Count, Pierre de Bigorre, and then besieged Bayonne and its Vicomte Arnaud for ten days, and then marched south as far as Port du Cize (Port d'Espagne).

In April 1344, Bishop Pierre de Saint-Johan, O.P. was appointed by King Edward III of England to head an embassy to arrange a peace between subjects of the King and men under the control of King Alfonso XI of Castile and the Count of Biscay. On 2 January 1345 he was appointed to head the commission which was to engage in the late-state negotiations for the treaty of marriage of the King's son John with a daughter of King Alfonso. On 14 February 1348 Bishop de Saint-Johan was named one of the arbitrators on claims and complaints between English and Castilian subjects. Also given powers as arbitrators were the sacristan, the major chaplain, and another of the canons of the cathedral, and others.

=== Cathedral and Chapter ===
The replacement for the old Romanesque cathedral, whose history is lost, was begun under Arnaud Loup de Bessabat, ca. 1140-1141. In 1199 and again in 1224, fires damaged the fabric, and in 1258 another fire destroyed half of the city of Bayonne and much of the choir of the Cathedral. Reconstruction began almost immediately in the Gothic style. In 1310 yet another fire destroyed most of what still remained of the Romanesque building; the more recent Gothic work remained untouched. The original main altar of the Gothic cathedral had on its sides the arms of Cardinal Guillaume Pierre Godin, who died in 1335. The new altar, sanctuary and choir were the work of Bishop René-François de Beauvau du Rivau (1701–1707).

The canons of the cathedral chapter of Bayonne are attested as early as the 12th century, living perhaps under the rule of the canons of Saint Augustine. During the Great Schism (1378–1416), the number of canons increased to a total of eighteen: eight of them supporting one side resided in Bayonne, eight others who supported the other pope resided in Basse-Navarre at St-Jean-Pied-de-Porte. The Council of Constance took cognizance of the situation in its 31st Session, and ordered that the number be reduced to the traditional twelve. In the 17th and 18th centuries there were only the twelve canons.

The Chapter of Bayonne had a set of statutes as early as 1322, which are known to have regulated the distributions which came to the canons by virtue of their office. In 1533 Bishop Étienne de Poncher (1532–1551) published Statutes of the Synod, which included legislation on the practices of the choir, which the canons discussed and accepted, but which had become a dead letter by 1570, due no doubt to the protestantization of the Gascon part of the diocese, and the partition ordered by Pope Pius V in 1566. On 15 August 1676, Bishop Jean d'Olce issued new Statutes for the cathedral chapter on the recommendation of the promoter of the diocese, in order to address various abuses in the carrying out of sacred ceremonies. This enactment lasted well into the 18th century. The cathedral chapter was dissolved in 1790, along with all the other chapters in France.

By the 12th or 13th century, the diocese north of the Pyrenees had three archdeacons: Labourde, Cize, and Arberoue. South of the Pyrenees was the Archdeaconry of Baztan. All seem to have disappeared by the beginning of the 16th century.

The diocese also contained two monasteries, both of Premonstratensians: Leuntium (La Honce), a few miles east of Bayonne; and Urdacium (Ourdace), in Navarre. Both were dissolved by the National Assembly in 1790, and their property sold for the benefit of the people. At the beginning of the 18th century there were seven houses of religious in Bayonne, the Dominicans, the Franciscans, the Carmelites, the Augustinians, the Capuchins, the Clarisses, and the Recollects. In 1745 there were also five houses of religious men.

=== Revolution and Concordat ===
During the French Revolution the diocese of Bayonne was suppressed by the Legislative Assembly, under the Civil Constitution of the Clergy (1790). Its territory was subsumed into the new diocese, called 'Basses-Pyrenees', which was coterminous with the new civil department of the same name. The dioceses of Oloron and Lescar were also suppressed and their bishops dismissed, and their territories were joined to the former diocese of Oleron, with the seat of the Constitutional Diocese at Oloron. Basses-Pyrenees was made part of the Metropolitanate called the 'Métropole du Sud'.

A constitutional bishop was elected, Barthélémy-Jean-Baptiste Sanadon. Sanadon was principal of the Collège de Pau, when he was called on to take the oath to the Civil Constitution. On 1 March 1791 he was elected Constitutional Bishop of Hautes-Pyrenées by a vote of 174 to 96. He was consecrated a bishop in Paris on 26 April by Constitutional Bishop Jean-Baptiste Gobel. The consecration was valid but illicit and uncanonical. Sanadon and Gobel and all the other constitutional bishops were schismatic. On Sanadon's return to Pau, the vicar general of the legitimate bishop of Oloron excommunicated him. He was a member of the convention which voted on the execution of King Louis XVI, which he opposed. His opposition brought him under suspicion of the Jacobins, and he was arrested and imprisoned in Bayonne. He was released, but died on 9 January 1796.

The cathedral chapter and the archdeaconries were reestablished by a decree of Bishop Paul d'Astros on 18 September 1821, though only two archdeaconries were created, Bayonne and Pau, and the two archdeacons also bore the title of vicar general. The decree also reorganized the diocese into five districts, each headed by an archpriest, who supervised 40 deans and 440 parishes.

In World War I, 560 priests and seminarians were mobilized from the diocese of Bayonne, 50 of whom died. In 1921 there were 40 deaneries and 507 parishes.

In 2009 Bishop Marc Aillet reestablished the Major Seminary for the diocese of Bayonne. A new seminary building, Le Séminaire des Saints Cœurs de Jésus et de Marie et de la propédeutique Sainte-Croix, opened on 1 October 2016. There is also the Grand Séminaire Saint-Joseph in Bordeaux.

In 2017 there were 234 priests incardinated (licensed by the bishop to function) in the Diocese of Bayonne, of whom 168 were on active service.

== Bishops ==
=== to 1400 ===
[Sedacius (c. 844–850)]
[Léon I (c. 900?)]
[Arsius (c. 980)]
[Raymond le Vieux (1025–1059)]
[Raymond le Jeune (1059–1063)]

- Guillaume I (c. 1065? – )
- Bernard I d'Astarac (c. 1090 – 1118)
- Garsias I (c. 1120 – ?)
- Raymond III de Martres (1122 – death 1125.04.22)
- Arnaud I Loup de Benabat (1126 – 1137)
- Arnaud II Formatel (1137–1149)
- Fortaner (c.1150–1170?)
- Pierre I Bertrand d'Espelette (1170–1178)
- Adhémar (1179–1184?)
- Bernard II de Lacarre (1185–1206)
- Arsivus de Navailles (c. 1207 – ? )
- Raymond IV de Luc (1213–1224)
- Guillaume II de Donzac (1225–1229)

[Pierre II Bertrand de Sault (1230–1233)]

- Raymond V de Donzac (c. 1233–1257)
- Sanz de Haïtce (1259?–1278)
- Dominique de Manx (1279–1302)
- Arnaud III Raymond de Mont(1303 – death 1308)
- Pierre III de Marenne (1309 – 1314)
- Bernard III de Brèle (29 March 1314 – 1316)
- Pierre IV de Maslac, O.F.M. (20 December 1316 – 1318)
- Pierre V de Saint-Johan, O.P. (27 June 1319 – 1356)
- Guillaume III du Pin (8 February 1357 – 1361)
- Guillaume IV de Saint-Johan (1362–1369)
- Pierre VI d'Oriach, O.F.M. (20 June 1371 – 1381?)
- Barthélémy de La Rivière, O.P. (1382–1392) (Roman Obedience)
- Pierre de Sumalaga (22 April 1383 – 1384) (Avignon Obedience)
- Garsias Eugui (12 February 1384 – 1408) (Avignon Obedience)
- Menendo Cordula, O.E.S.A. (1393–1405) (Roman Obedience)

=== 1400 to 1700 ===
- Pierre VII du Vernet (1406–1416) (Roman Obedience)
- Guillaume V Arnaud de Laborde (3 July 1409 – 9 December 1444) (Avignon Obedience)
- Pierre VIII de Mauloc (1416–1417) (Roman Obedience)
- Garsias III Arnaud de Lasègue (1444.12.09 – 1454)
- Jean I de Mareuil (1 July 1454 – 28 September 1463)
- Jean de Laur (28 September 1463 – 5 May 1484)

Cardinal Pierre de Foix, O.F.M. (1484.05.05 – 1490.08.10) (Apostolic Administrator)

- Jean III de La Barrière (3 July 1495 – 1504)
- Bertrand I de Lahet (8 July 1504 – 5 August 1519)
- Hector d'Ailly de Rochefort (23 December 1519 – 12 February 1524)
- Jean du Bellay (12 February 1524 – 16 September 1532)
- Étienne de Poncher (25 September 1532 – 6 April 1551)
- Jean de Moustiers du Fraisse (Froissac) (6 April 1551 – 1565?)
- Jean de Sossiondo (13 March 1566 – 1579)
- Jacques Maury (4 November 1579 – 15 January 1593)
- Bertrand II d'Echaux (17 March 1599 – 26 June 1617)
- Claude des Marets de Rueil (15 November 1621 – 20 March 1628)

[Henri de Béthune]

- Raymond VI de Montaigne (4 March 1629– 3 February 1637)
- François I Fouquet (28 February 1639 – 16 November 1643)
- Jean VII d'Olce (31 August 1643 – 8 February 1681)
- Gaspard de Priêle (22 September 1681 – 19 June 1688)
- Léon II de Lalanne (10 March 1692 – 6 August 1700)

=== 1700 to 1909 ===
- René-François de Beauvau du Rivau (18 April 1701 – 1707)
- André de Druillet (7 November 1707 – 19 November 1727)
- Pierre-Guillaume de La Vieuxville (14 June 1728 – 30 June 1734)
- Jacques Bonne-Gigault de Bellefonds (27 February 1736 – 25 November 1741)
- Christophe de Beaumont du Repaire (27 November 1741 – 8 July 1745)
- Guillaume VI d'Arche (19 July 1745 – 13 October 1774)
- Jules Ferron de La Ferronays (13 March 1774 – 15 December 1783)
- Etienne-Joseph de Pavée de La Villevieille (15 December 1783 – March 1793:

Sede Vacante (1793 – 1802)

- Joseph-Jacques Loison (1802–1820)
- 1820–1830: Paul-Thérèse-David d'Astros
- Étienne-Bruno-Marie d'Arbou (6 July 1830 – 26 September 1837)
- 1837–1878: François Lacroix
- Arthur-Xavier Ducellier (15 July 1878 – 16 April 1887)
- 1887–1889: Alfred-François Fleury-Hottot
- François-Antoine Jauffret (30 December 1889 – 16 June 1902)

Sede Vacante (1902–1906)

- François-Xavier-Marie-Jules Gieure (21 February 1906 – 1909: see below)

== Bishops of Bayonne, Lescar and Oloron ==
- François-Xavier-Marie-Jules Gieure (see above 1909 – retired 25 December 1933)
- Henri-Jean Houbaut (24 December 1934 – death 17 July 1939)
- Edmund Vansteenberghe (6 October 1939 – death 10 December 1943)
- Léon-Albert Terrier (24 July 1944 – death 12 May 1957)
- Paul-Joseph-Marie Gouyon (6 August 1957 – 6 August 1963)
- Jean-Paul-Marie Vincent (18 December 1963 – retired 13 June 1986), death 1994
- Pierre MolèresPierre Jean Marie Marcel Molères (13 June 1986 – retired 15 October 2008)
- Marc Aillet (15 October 2008 – ...).

=== Auxiliary Bishops ===
- François-Marie-Christian Favreau (24 November 1972 – 7 October 1977)
- Jean Yves Marie Sahuquet (11 December 1978 – 15 May 1985)

== See also ==
- List of Catholic dioceses in France
- Roman Catholic Diocese of Oloron
- Catholic Church in France

== Sources and external links ==
- GCatholic, with Google map & - satellite photo - data for all sections
- Goyau, Georges. "Bayonne." The Catholic Encyclopedia. Vol. 2. New York: Robert Appleton Company, 1907. Retrieved: 2016-09-28.

=== Bibliography ===
Reference works

- Gams, Pius Bonifatius (1873). Series episcoporum Ecclesiae catholicae: quotquot innotuerunt a beato Petro apostolo. Ratisbon: Typis et Sumptibus Georgii Josephi Manz. (Use with caution; obsolete)
- Eubel, Conradus, ed. (1913). Hierarchia catholica, Tomus 1 (second ed.). Münster: Libreria Regensbergiana. (in Latin)
- Eubel, Conradus, ed. (1914). Hierarchia catholica, Tomus 2 (second ed.). Münster: Libreria Regensbergiana. (in Latin)
- Eubel, Conradus, ed. (1923). Hierarchia catholica, Tomus 3 (second ed.). Münster: Libreria Regensbergiana.
- Gauchat, Patritius (Patrice) (1935). Hierarchia catholica IV (1592-1667). Münster: Libraria Regensbergiana.
- Ritzler, Remigius; Sefrin, Pirminus (1952). Hierarchia catholica medii et recentis aevi V (1667-1730). Patavii: Messagero di S. Antonio.
- Ritzler, Remigius; Sefrin, Pirminus (1958). Hierarchia catholica medii et recentis aevi VI (1730-1799). Patavii: Messagero di S. Antonio.
- Ritzler, Remigius; Sefrin, Pirminus (1968). Hierarchia Catholica medii et recentioris aevi sive summorum pontificum, S. R. E. cardinalium, ecclesiarum antistitum series... A pontificatu Pii PP. VII (1800) usque ad pontificatum Gregorii PP. XVI (1846) (in Latin). Vol. VII. Monasterii: Libr. Regensburgiana.
- Remigius Ritzler; Pirminus Sefrin (1978). Hierarchia catholica Medii et recentioris aevi... A Pontificatu PII PP. IX (1846) usque ad Pontificatum Leonis PP. XIII (1903) (in Latin). Vol. VIII. Il Messaggero di S. Antonio.
- Pięta, Zenon (2002). Hierarchia catholica medii et recentioris aevi... A pontificatu Pii PP. X (1903) usque ad pontificatum Benedictii PP. XV (1922) (in Latin). Vol. IX. Padua: Messagero di San Antonio. ISBN 978-88-250-1000-8.
- Sainte-Marthe, Denis de. Gallia christiana, vol. I, Paris 1715, coll. 1309-1326 (in Latin).

Studies

- Bidache, J. (1906). Le Livre d'Or de Bayonne. Pau 1906. (in French, Latin, Gascon)
- Bladé, J.-F. (1899). L'évêché des Gascons (Paris: Picard 1899). See also, P. Fontanié, "L'évêché des Gascons, par M. J.-F. Bladé," Bulletin archéologique et historique de la Société archéologique de Tarn-et-Garonne 27 (1899) 289-291.
- Bladé, Jean-François. (1897). "L'évêché des Gascons," Revue de l'Agenais et des anciennes provinces du Sud-Ouest 24 (1897), pp. 496-514; 25 (1898), pp. 159-170.
- Degert, J. (1934). lemma 'Bayonne', in Dictionnaire d'Histoire et de Géographie ecclésiastiques, vol. VII, 1934, coll. 54-59. (in French)
- Dubarat, Victor (1887). "L'ancien couvent des Carmes de Bayonne", in: Bulletin de la Société des Sciences Lettres et Arts de Bayonne, 1887, pp. 1–59. Dubarat, Victor Pierre (1887). L'ancien convent des carmes de Bayonne: notes et documents (in French). Bayonne: impr. A. Lamaignère.
- Dubarat, Victor (1901). Le Missel de Bayonne de 1543. Précédé d'une introduction sur les antiquités historiques et religieuses de l'ancien diocèse de Bayonne, Paris 1901. (in French)
- Dubarat, V.; Haristoy, P., eds. (1899). Études historiques et religieuses du diocèse de Bayonne: comprenant les anciens diocèses de Bayonne, Lescar, Oloron, etc (in French). Vol. Tome VIII. Pau: impr. Vignancour.
- Duchesne, Louis (1910). Fastes épiscopaux de l'ancienne Gaule, vol. II, deuxième édition, Paris 1910, pp. 17–18 and 89-90. (in French)
- Du Tems, Hugues (1774). Le clergé de France, ou tableau historique et chronologique des archevêques, évêques, abbés, abbesses et chefs des chapitres principaux du royaume, depuis la fondation des églises jusqu'à nos jours (in French). Vol. Tome premier. Paris: Delalain.
- Jaurgain, Jean de. La Vasconie; étude historique et critique sur les origines du royaume de Navarre, du duché de Gascogne, des comtés de Comminges, d'Aragon. de Foix, de Bigorre, d'Alava & de Biscaye, de la vicomté de Béarn et des grands fiefs du duché de Gascogne. Pau: Garet. 2 vols. (1898, 1902) (in French)
- Jean, Armand (1891). Les évêques et les archevêques de France depuis 1682 jusqu'à 1801 (in French). Paris: A. Picard. p. 78.
- Saint-Vanne, A. (1930). "La cathedrale de Bayonne". Bulletin trimestriel: Société des sciences, lettres, arts, et d'ėtudes regionales de Bayonne n.s. 5 (Bayonne 1930), pp. 10–51. (in French)
- Société bibliographique (France) (1907). L'épiscopat français depuis le Concordat jusqu'à la Séparation (1802-1905). Paris: Librairie des Saints-Pères.
