= Michael W. Bevan =

British academic

Mike Bevan
- Born: Michael Webster Bevan; 5 June 1952 (age 74)
- Education: University of Auckland (BSc, MSc); Corpus Christi College, Cambridge (PhD)
- Awards: FRS (2013); Rank Prize (1987); Genetics Society Medal (2018)
- Scientific career
- Fields: Genetics; Genomics; Plant breeding; Plant Sciences; Molecular biology
- Workplaces: Washington University in St. Louis; AFRC; Plant Breeding Institute, Cambridge; John Innes Centre
- Thesis: Differentiation in plant tissue cultures (1979)
- Website: jic.ac.uk/staff/michael-bevan; www.jic.ac.uk/profile/michael-bevan.asp

Michael Webster Bevan (born 5 June 1952) is a professor at the John Innes Centre, Norwich, UK.

== Education ==
Bevan was educated at the University of Auckland where he was awarded a Bachelor of Science in 1973 and a Master of Science in 1974. He went on to study at Corpus Christi College, Cambridge, where he was awarded a PhD in 1979 for work on differentiation in plant tissue cultures.

== Research and career ==
Following his PhD, Bevan did postdoctoral research with Mary-Dell Chilton at Washington University in St. Louis where he identified ways to make functional chimaeric genes based on knowledge of gene function.

Bevan returned to the UK at the Plant Breeding Institute, Cambridge in 1980, part of the Agricultural and Food Research Council (AFRC). This became the John Innes Centre of the Biotechnology and Biological Sciences Research Council (BBSRC) where he has worked since 1988.

As of 2014, Bevan's laboratory focus on the molecular control of plant growth.

== Awards and honours ==
Bevan was elected a Fellow of the Royal Society (FRS) in 2013. His nomination reads:

Michael Bevan's work laid the foundations of modern day plant molecular biology and genetics. He pioneered plant transformation and expression technologies, developing the most widely used vector and gene expression systems. He played a major role in the multi-national efforts to sequence the Arabidopsis and Brachypodium genomes, which provide key foundations for plant biology. He has capitalised on this by his analyses of gene function and growth control in plants. He has recently completed the first analysis of the large, complex and important genome of bread wheat, aiming to develop resources for molecular breeding and improvement of this globally important crop.

He was appointed Officer of the Order of the British Empire (OBE) in the 2019 Birthday Honours for services to plant genomics.
