= List of fellows of the Royal Society elected in 2013 =

This article lists fellows of the Royal Society who were elected in 2013.

== Fellows (FRS) ==
1. Harry Anderson
2. Judy Armitage
3. Keith Ball
4. Michael W. Bevan
5. Mervyn Bibb
6. Stephen R. Bloom
7. Gilles Brassard
8. Michael Burrows
9. Jon Crowcroft
10. Ara Darzi, Baron Darzi of Denham
11. William C. Earnshaw
12. Gerard F. Gilmore
13. Nigel Glover
14. Raymond E. Goldstein
15. Melvyn A. Goodale
16. Martin Green
17. Gillian Griffiths
18. Joanna Haigh
19. Phillip Thomas Hawkins
20. Edith Heard
21. Gideon Henderson
22. Guy Lloyd-Jones
23. Stephen P. Long
24. Nicholas Lydon
25. Anne Mills
26. Paul O'Brien
27. William D. Richardson
28. Gareth Roberts
29. R. Kerry Rowe
30. Sir John Savill
31. Christopher J. Schofield
32. Paul M. Sharp
33. Stephen J. Simpson
34. Terry Speed
35. Maria Grazia Spillantini
36. Douglas Stephan
37. Brigitta Stockinger
38. Alan Turnbull
39. Jean-Paul Vincent
40. Andrew Wilkie
41. Sophie Wilson
42. Terry Wyatt
43. Julia Yeomans
44. Robert J. Young

== Foreign Members (ForMemRS) ==
1. Margaret Buckingham
2. Chen Zhu
3. John W. Hutchinson
4. Eric Kandel
5. Elliott Lieb
6. Kyriacos Costa Nicolaou
7. Randy Schekman
8. Eli Yablonovitch

== Royal Fellow ==
- Prince Andrew, Duke of York

== Honorary Fellow ==
- Bill Bryson
