= Jean-Paul Vincent =

Jean-Paul Vincent FRS FMedSci
- Education: University of Louvain; University of California, Berkeley (MA, PhD)
- Awards: FRS (2013)
- Scientific career
- Fields: Developmental biology
- Workplaces: Francis Crick Institute
- Website: jpvincentlab.com

Jean-Paul Vincent is a developmental biologist working at the Francis Crick Institute.

== Research ==
Vincent has conducted work on the Wnt signalling pathways that help to regulate cell-to-cell interactions.

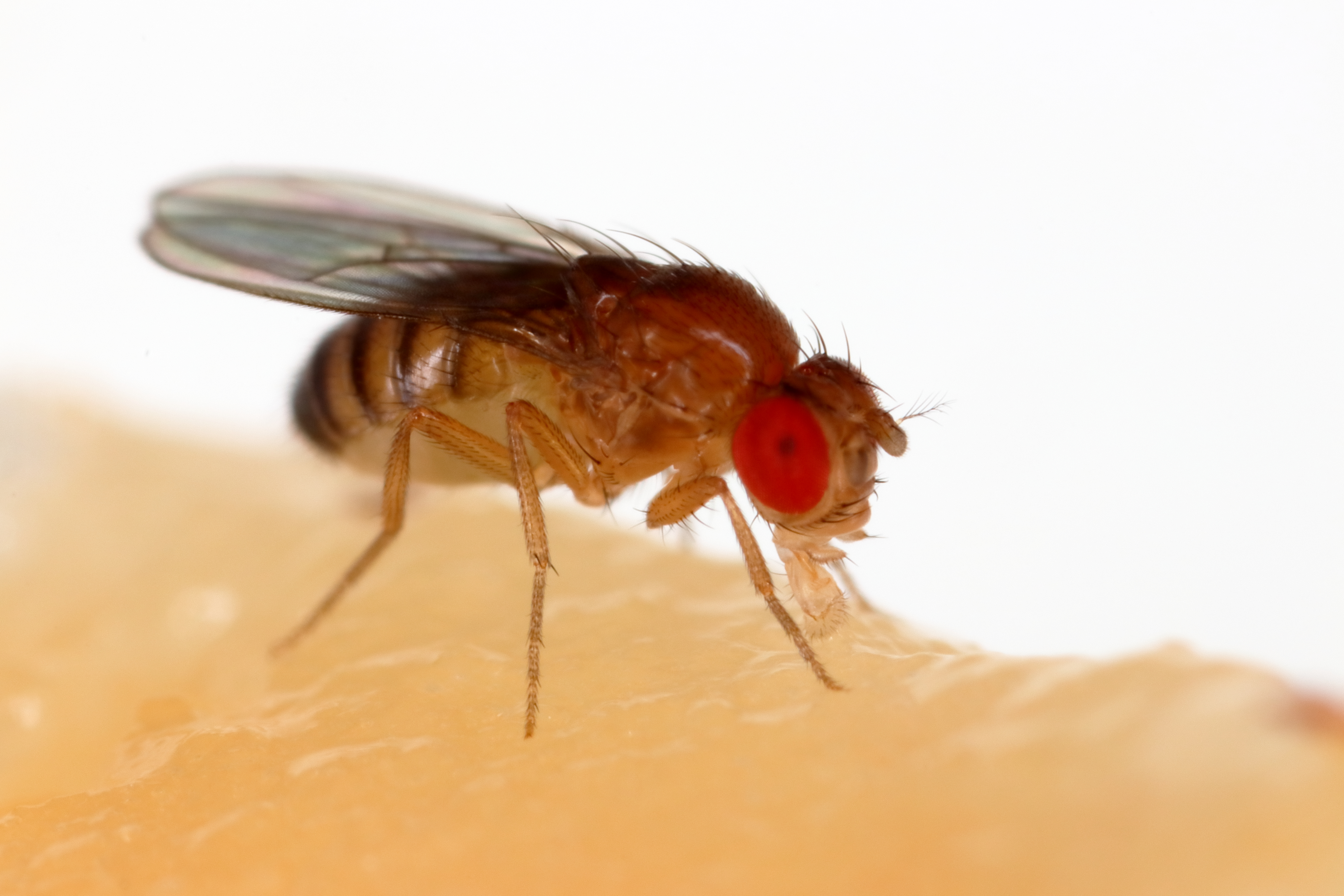
Drosophila Melanogaster. Jean-Paul Vincent worked on the development of fruit fly embryos

His work on cell signalling and behaviour has led to an improved understanding of diseases such as cancer in which fundamental biological processes are altered. Earlier in his career, he pioneered the use of caged dye technology to trace the cellular development of fruit fly embryos, and established a relationship between the alignment of frog embryos and their so-called subcortical rotation in the egg.

== Awards and honours ==
Vincent was elected a Fellow of the Royal Society (FRS) in 2013. His certificate of election reads:

JP Vincent has used his training in mathematics, physics to devise new techniques to solve important problems in developmental biology. Using novel laser-staining methods he discovered the cortical rotation in frog eggs. He then co-invented caged dye technology, adapted it to lineage tracing and showed that, in living Drosophila embryos, cells acquire identity step by step. Later, he introduced an HRP fusion strategy to study trafficking and epithelial organisation in transgenic animals. This allowed him show that endocytic trafficking of Wnts is spatially and temporally regulated. His work has spurred many others to investigate how trafficking modulate signalling pathways

He is a Fellow of the Academy of Medical Sciences.

In 2024, Vincent was awarded The Waddington Medal by the British Society for Developmental Biology, awarded for major contributions to developmental biology in the United Kingdom.
