= Stephen R. Bloom =

British medical academic

Sir Stephen Bloom
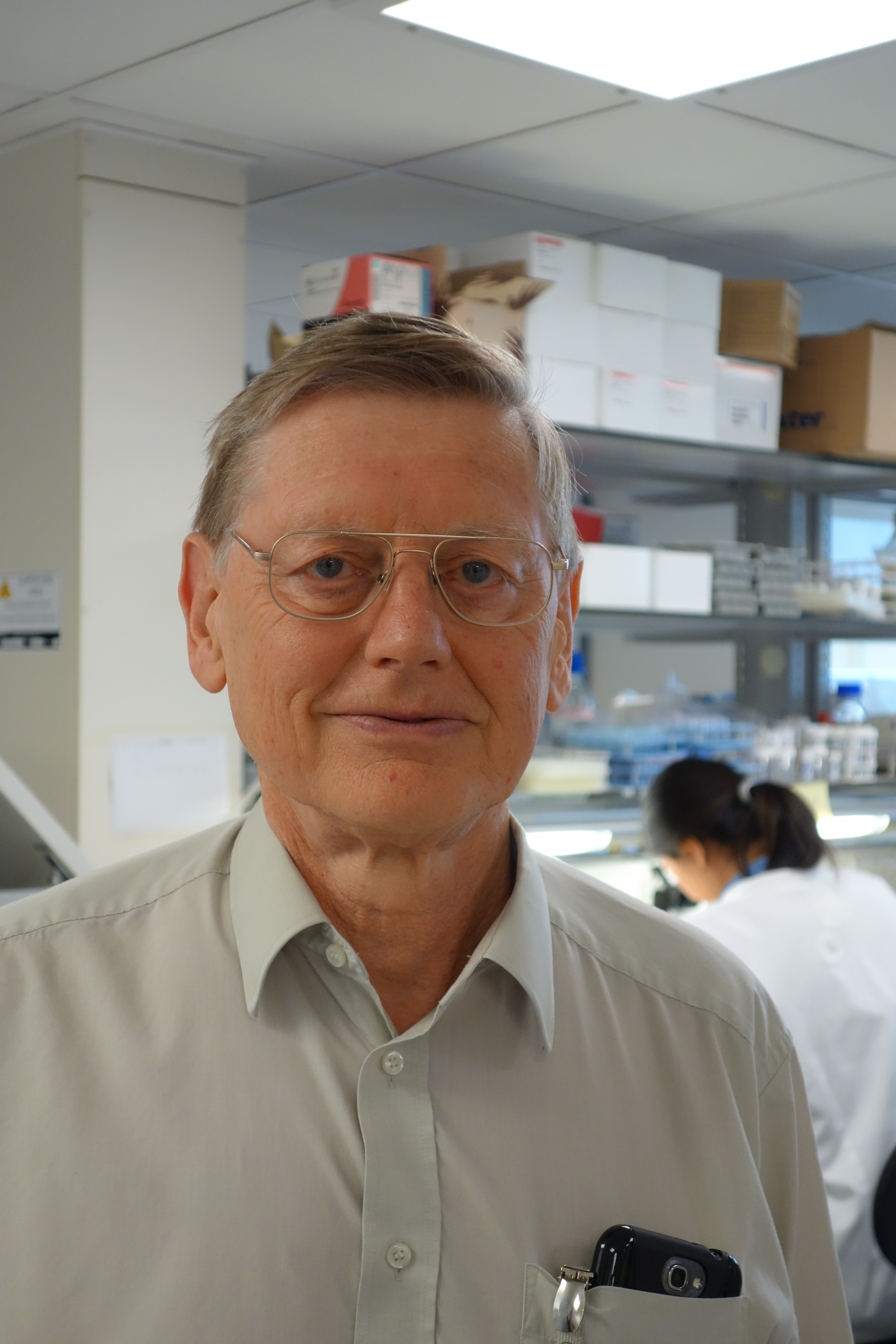
- Bloom in 2013
- Born: Stephen Robert Bloom; 24 October 1942 (age 83)
- Education: University of Cambridge (MA, MD)
- Spouse: Margaret Janet Bloom (née Sturrock) (m. 1965)
- Children: four
- Awards: Knight Bachelor (2012); DSc; FRCP; FRCPath; FMedSci; FRS (2013); FRSB
- Scientific career
- Workplaces: Imperial College London; University College London; Middlesex Hospital

Sir Stephen Robert Bloom FRS (born 24 October 1942) is a British Professor of Medicine at Imperial College London where he leads the Diabetes, Endocrinology and Metabolism division.

== Education ==
Bloom was educated at Queens' College, Cambridge, where he was awarded a Master of Arts degree in 1968 and a Doctor of Medicine degree in 1979. He received his Doctor of Science (DSc) degree from the University of London in 1982. Bloom completed appointments as a house officer, senior house officer and specialist registrar at Middlesex Hospital, University College London, where he also received his Medical Research Council (MRC) Clinical Research Fellowship training.

== Awards and honours ==
Bloom was a founder fellow of the Academy of Medical Sciences (FMedSci) in 1998. He was elected a Fellow of the Royal Society (FRS) in 2013. His nomination reads:

Bloom played a seminal role in establishing the biology and pathophysiology of the intrinsic endocrine system of the gastrointestinal tract, an area which he pioneered and which is now a major focus of basic and applied laboratories worldwide. Through the identification of clinical syndromes associated with overproduction of these hormones and experimental physiological studies in man, Bloom established the physiological effects of these hormones. Importantly, he recognised that several gut derived peptides powerfully influenced glucose homeostasis and/or appetite, insights which have led to major developments in the treatment of Type 2 diabetes and obesity.

Blooms research has been funded by grants awarded by the BBSRC, the Medical Research Council (MRC) and the National Institute for Health Research (NIHR).

Bloom was also knighted in the Queen's 2012 New Year Honours, and awarded Fellowships of the Royal College of Physicians (FRCP), Royal College of Pathologists (FRCPath), the Academy of Medical Sciences (FMedSci) and the Royal Society of Biology (FRSB). Bloom is Chairman of a Biotechnology Company, Zihipp, which completed round A funding in January 2020. It specialises in peptide hormone analogues to treat obesity and diabetes.
