= Andrew Wilkie (geneticist) =

British geneticist (born 1959)

Andrew Wilkie FRS FMedSci FRCP
- Born: Andrew Oliver Mungo Wilkie; 14 September 1959 (age 67)
- Education: Arnold House School; Westminster School; University of Cambridge; University of Oxford
- Awards: EMBO Member (2006)
- Scientific career
- Fields: Medical genetics
- Workplaces: University of Oxford
- Notable students: Anne Goriely (postdoc)
- Website: www.rdm.ox.ac.uk/people/andrew-wilkie

Andrew Oliver Mungo Wilkie (born 14 September 1959) is a British clinical geneticist who has been the Nuffield professor of Pathology at the University of Oxford since 2003.

== Education ==
Wilkie was educated at Arnold House School, Westminster School and Trinity College, Cambridge, where he was awarded a Bachelor of Arts degree in 1980 and a Master of Arts degree in 1984. He moved to Merton College, Oxford, where he was awarded a Bachelor of Medicine, Bachelor of Surgery degree in 1983 and subsequently a Doctor of Medicine degree in 1992.

== Career and Positions ==
- Honorary Consultant in Clinical Genetics at Oxford University Hospitals since 1993
- Nuffield Professor of Pathology at the MRC Weatherall Institute of Molecular Medicine
- Membership in professional bodies such as the British Society for Genetic Medicine and EMBO

== Research ==
Wilkie's research investigates genetic disorders affecting the skull and limbs, especially craniosynostosis – premature fusion of the sutures of the skull. He identified the gene mutation responsible for Apert syndrome and the molecular pathways underlying this and other craniosynostosis conditions. These results have led to many clinical diagnostic tests.

Wilkie's discovery that the mutation causing Apert syndrome was more common than expected led him to develop the 'selfish selection' theory, which states that there is a proliferation or survival advantage for some mutations in the testis. Over time, sperm-generating cells carrying such mutations become prevalent, explaining why some conditions are more common in children born to older fathers.

Wilkie demonstrated that the Ras molecular pathway, the common factor in paternal age effect conditions, is also important in the development of nerves and tumours. Consequently, his work has implications for other diseases, including autism and cancer. His research has been funded by the Medical Research Council (MRC). His former postdoctoral students include Anne Goriely.

=== Awards and honours ===
Wilkie was elected a Fellow of the Academy of Medical Sciences (FMedSci) in 2002, the European Molecular Biology Organization (EMBO) in 2006 and a Fellow of the Royal Society (FRS) in 2013.

== Personal life ==
Wilkie is the son of Douglas Robert Wilkie FRS.
