= Anne Goriely =

British geneticist and academic

- Education: Université libre de Bruxelles
- Scientific career
- Fields: Genetics; Development; Mutations
- Workplaces: University of Oxford; Rockefeller University; Weill Cornell Medicine
- Website: www.rdm.ox.ac.uk/people/anne-goriely

Anne Goriely is a Belgian geneticist who is a professor of human genetics at the University of Oxford. Her research investigates the molecular mechanisms that underpin genetic variation, particularly mutations in the male germline.

== Early life and education ==
Goriely was an undergraduate student in agronomy at the Université libre de Bruxelles. Her doctoral research investigated the developmental biology of nervous systems in the fruit fly Drosophila melanogaster. She was a graduate researcher at the Weill Cornell Medicine and Rockefeller University. She is the sister of Alain Goriely.

== Research and career ==
In 2000, Goriely joined the University of Oxford as a postdoctoral researcher with Andrew Wilkie. She remained in Oxford to establish her own research group in clinical genetics. She studies mutations – the origin of all genetic variations. By investigating and understanding mutations, Goriely aims to better understand disease and evolution. As mutations arise from random miscopying events and are mainly from the paternal germline, Goriely has studied mutations and the regulation of cell fates in male germline stem cells. She primarily makes use of genetic sequencing.

Goriely showed that pathogenic mutations hijack stem production, become enriched in the testis as men age and are likely to be transferred to future generations. She coined the phrase "Selfish Spermatogonial Selection" to describe the link between paternal age and neurodevelopment disorders. These disorders include Apert syndrome, Achondroplasia, Noonan syndrome and Costello syndrome. Goriely has argued that more attention needs to be paid to male fertility.

Goriely describes these as paternal age effect disorders, and demonstrated that due to principles similar to oncogenesis they spontaneously occur at high levels compared to background rates of mutation. She showed that pathways included the growth factor-receptor-RAS protein signalling cascade. She has shown that these molecular pathways are implicated in other cellular contexts. Selfish Spermatogonial Selection is likely to impact all men as they age, and can increase predisposition to cancer and neurodevelopment disorders such as schizophrenia.

=== Selected publications ===
Her publications include:

- Opposing FGF and retinoid pathways control ventral neural pattern, neuronal differentiation, and segmentation during body axis extension
- Factors influencing success of clinical genome sequencing across a broad spectrum of disorders
- Paternal age effect mutations and selfish spermatogonial selection: causes and consequences for human disease
