= Killing of Olivier Maire =

French Roman Catholic priest

Olivier Maire
- Provincial Superior of the Company of Mary in France
- Church: Saint-Laurent-sur-Sèvre
- Diocese: Luçon

Orders
- Ordination: 17 June 1990

Personal details
- Born: 19 November 1960 Besançon, France
- Died: 9 August 2021 (aged 60) Saint-Laurent-sur-Sèvre, France
- Occupation: Roman Catholic priest

Olivier Maire S.M.M. (19 November 1960 – 9 August 2021) was a French Roman Catholic priest. Assassinated in Saint-Laurent-sur-Sèvre, he was a member of the Montfort Missionaries.

== Biography ==
Born into a very pious family, Maire became religious from a young age. He entered the Collège de Pelousey and the Lycée Saint-Jean de Besançon, where he earned his baccalauréat. After his studies in biology, he spent his military service in Haiti. He then earned a degree in theology in Rome, being ordained a priest and joining the Company of Mary. He then trained seminarians in Uganda for many years.

A biblical critic, Maire was passionate about the Church Fathers and the Patristics, he also earned a degree in psychology. Upon his return to France, he was elected provincial superior of the Montfortaines and was installed in Saint-Laurent-sur-Sèvre.

Olivier Maire was murdered on 9 August 2021,by Emmanuel Abayisenga, a Rwandan national who was suspected of having started the 2020 Nantes Cathedral fire and whom he had taken in. His funeral took place on 13 August 2021, in the Basilica of Saint Louis de Montfort in Saint-Laurent-sur-Sèvre, celebrated by Monsignor Éric de Moulins-Beaufort, president of the Bishops' Conference of France, Monsignor François Jacolin, Bishop of Luçon, and Reverend Luis Augusto Stefani, Superior General of the Company of Mary. Minister of Justice Éric Dupond-Moretti and Senator Bruno Retailleau also attended the ceremony.
