= Alain Castet =

French Catholic bishop (born 1950)

- Bishop Emeritus of Luçon
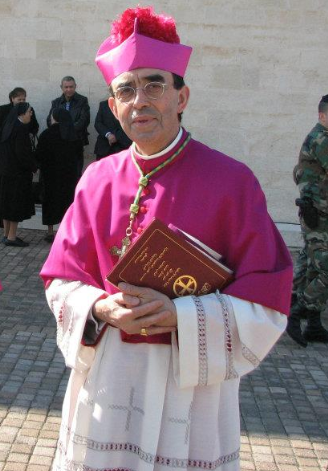
- Church: Catholic Church
- Diocese: Diocese of Luçon
- In office: 14 April 2008 – 12 October 2017
- Predecessor: Michel Santier
- Successor: François Jacolin

Orders
- Ordination: 28 June 1975 by François Marty
- Consecration: 29 June 2008 by André Vingt-Trois

Personal details
- Born: 10 May 1950 (age 76) Floirac, Gironde, France

Alain Castet (born 10 May 1950 in Floirac, Gironde) is a French Roman Catholic bishop, the Emeritus bishop of Luçon (Vendée) since 2017.

== Biography ==
=== Education ===
After studying for the priesthood at Saint-Sulpice Seminary in Issy-les-Moulineaux, Alain Castet was ordained a priest on 28 June 1975 for the Archdiocese of Paris.

He completed further studies at the Institut Catholique de Paris, earning a licentiate in philosophy and a master's degree in sacramental theology.

=== Pastoral ministry ===
His priestly ministry was mainly focused on parish responsibilities in Paris, particularly as the pastor of Saint-Antoine de Padoue, Saint-Pierre-du-Gros-Caillou, and Saint-François-Xavier. He also served as a chaplain for middle and high school students for thirteen years.

At the diocesan level, he was a member of the presbyteral council office of Paris from 2007 to 2008.

He was appointed Bishop of Luçon on 14 April 2008, a seat that had been vacant since the transfer of Michel Santier to the Diocese of Créteil, and he was consecrated on the following 29 June 2008 by Cardinal André Vingt-Trois, assisted by François-Xavier Loizeau, bishop of Digne, and Gabriel Anokye, bishop of Obuasi.

In 2010, by canonically establishing the Institut Catholique d'Études Supérieures, he became the first chancellor of this institute officially recognized by the Catholic Church.

In 2012, an article in Ouest-France indicated that he had been criticized for celebrating, using the Pontificale Romanum in force in 1962, the ordination of six deacons at the international seminary of the Priestly Fraternity of Saint Peter, a society of apostolic life of traditionalist Catholics in communion with the Holy See. The spokesperson for the French Bishops' Conference, Bernard Podvin, denounced the confusion made with the Society of Saint Pius X, indicating that this ordination was an act of communion, which other bishops, like Cardinal Ricard, had previously performed.

On 12 October 2017, Pope Francis accepted Castet's resignation from his role as bishop of Luçon for health reasons.

== Distinctions ==
- Knight of the Legion of Honour (2007)

== Works ==
- Dieu existe, j'ai pu le voir, Siloé Editions, 2012
- Vendée: Luçon, Maillezais, Saint-Laurent-sur-Sèvre, under the direction of Bishop Alain Castet, La Grâce d'une Cathédrale series, La Nuée Bleue Editions, 2017
- 700 years of the Diocese of Luçon: homilies, speeches and conferences, Oyats Editions, 2017
- (ed.), Vendée - Luçon, Maillezais, Saint-Laurent-sur-Sèvre - La Grâce d'une Cathédrale, Place des Victoires Editions, 2017.

== See also ==
- Bishop

== Notes and references ==
https://www.catholic-hierarchy.org/bishop/bcastet.html
