= Moreilles =

- Commune
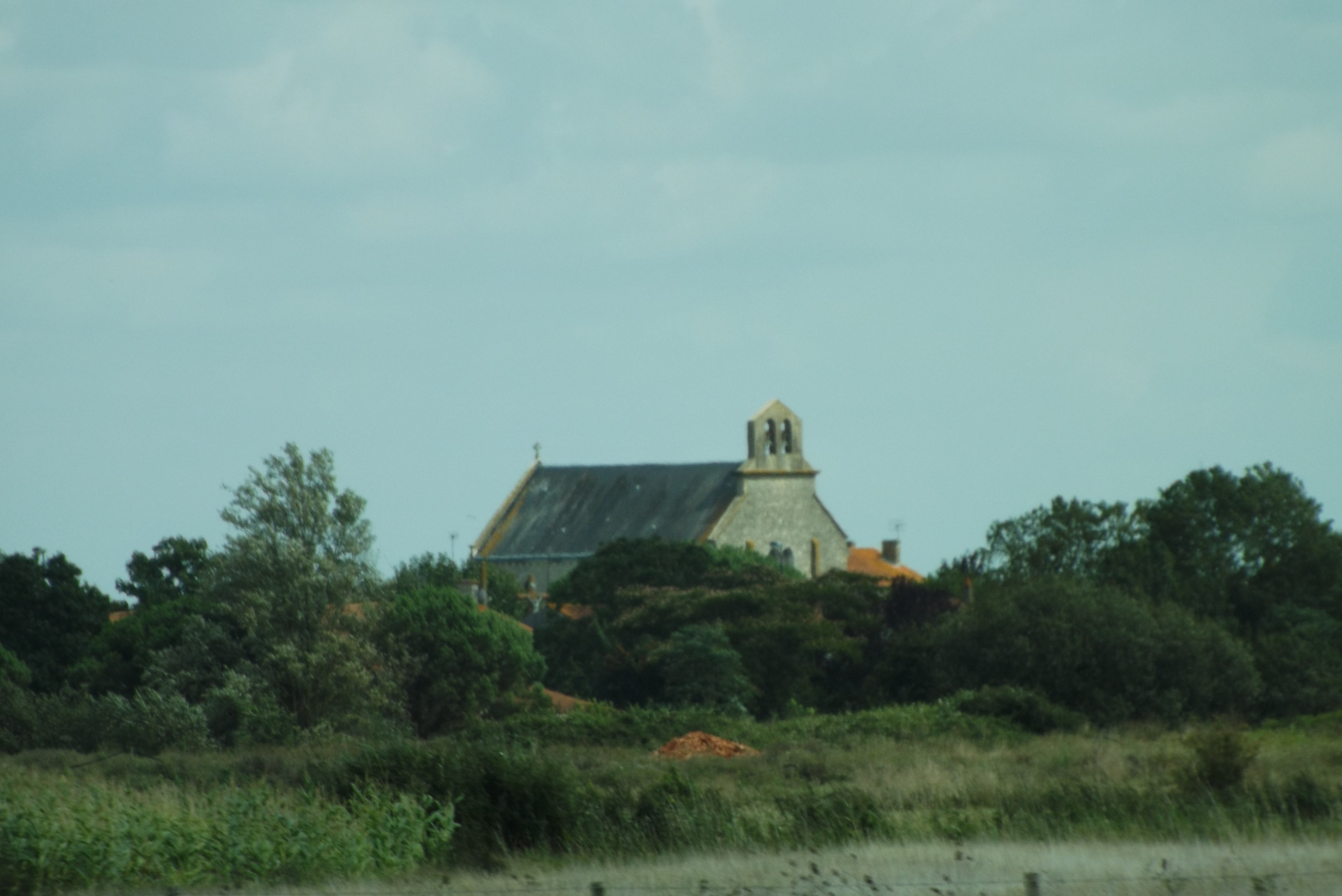
- A view towards the church in Moreilles
- Location of Moreilles
- Location within France Location within Pays de la Loire
- Coordinates: 46°25′20″N 1°05′01″W
- Country: France
- Region: Pays de la Loire
- Department: Vendée
- Arrondissement: Fontenay-le-Comte
- Canton: Luçon
- Intercommunality: Sud Vendée Littoral

Government
  - Mayor (2020–2026): Bertrand Guinot
- Area^{1}: 19.68 km^{2} (7.60 sq mi)
- Highest elevation: 6 m (20 ft)
- Lowest elevation: 0 m (0 ft)
- Population (2023): 407
  - Density: 20.7/km^{2} (53.6/sq mi)
- Time zone: UTC+01:00 (CET)
  - Summer (DST): UTC+02:00 (CEST)
- INSEE/Postal code: 85149 /85450
- ^{1} French Land Register data, which excludes lakes, ponds, glaciers > 1 km^{2} (0.386 sq mi or 247 acres) and river estuaries.

Moreilles (French pronunciation: [mɔʁɛj]) is a commune in the Vendée department, Pays de la Loire region, western France. It is located 10 km south east of Luçon.

== See also ==
- Communes of the Vendée department
