= Saint-Michel-en-l'Herm =

- Commune
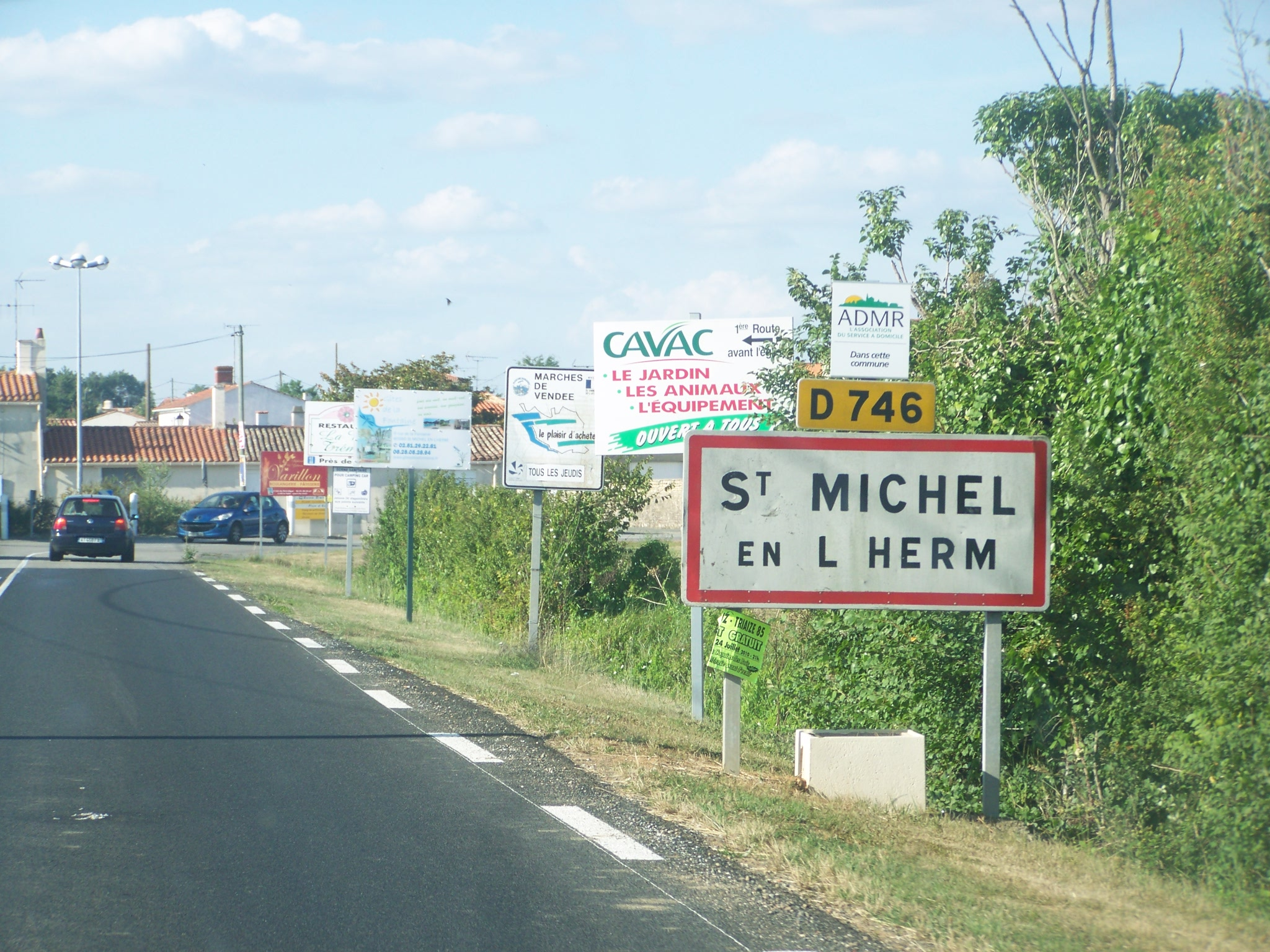
- The road into Saint-Michel en l'Herm
- Location of Saint-Michel-en-l'Herm
- Location within France Location within Pays de la Loire
- Coordinates: 46°21′19″N 1°14′51″W
- Country: France
- Region: Pays de la Loire
- Department: Vendée
- Arrondissement: Fontenay-le-Comte
- Canton: Luçon
- Intercommunality: Sud Vendée Littoral

Government
  - Mayor (2020–2026): Éric Sautreau
- Area^{1}: 54.8 km^{2} (21.2 sq mi)
- Highest elevation: 17 m (56 ft)
- Lowest elevation: 1 m (3.3 ft)
- Population (2023): 2,329
  - Density: 42.5/km^{2} (110/sq mi)
- Time zone: UTC+01:00 (CET)
  - Summer (DST): UTC+02:00 (CEST)
- INSEE/Postal code: 85255 /85580
- ^{1} French Land Register data, which excludes lakes, ponds, glaciers > 1 km^{2} (0.386 sq mi or 247 acres) and river estuaries.

Saint-Michel-en-l'Herm (French pronunciation: [sɛ̃ miʃɛl ɑ̃ lɛʁm]) is a commune in the Vendée department in the Pays de la Loire region in western France.

One of the most famous local landmarks is the Abbey of Saint-Michel-en-l'Herm. The abbey dates from 682 AD when it was constructed by Benedictine monks from Noirmoutier. In 1569, Protestants attacked it, killing approximately 200 monks. The motives for the attack are still debated, but one theory is that the attackers sought treasure and manuscripts hidden by the Bishop of Luçon.

== Population ==
Historical population
Year	Pop.	±% p.a.
1968	1,898	—
1975	1,937	+0.29%
1982	1,944	+0.05%
1990	1,999	+0.35%
1999	1,931	−0.38%
2007	2,010	+0.50%
2012	2,281	+2.56%
2017	2,352	+0.61%
2023	2,329	−0.16%
Source: INSEE

== See also ==
- Communes of the Vendée department
