= Institut catholique d'études supérieures =

Small private university

Coordinates: 46.6727°N 1.4197°W

- Type: Private
- Established: 1990
- Affiliations: ICUSTA
- Director: Éric Ghérardi
- Students: 1900
- Location: La Roche-sur-Yon, France
- Website: http://www.ices.fr

The Institut catholique d'études supérieures (English: Catholic Institute of Higher Studies), also called Catholic University of Vendée, is a Grande école in Vendée, France, founded in 1989.

In 1990, under the authority of the Catholic University of the West, the Catholic University of the Vendée (ICES) was opened in La Roche-sur-Yon. After three years of collaboration, the Superior Council of the Catholic University of the West awarded the Catholic University of the Vendée (ICES) its academic independence in 1993. François Garnier, Bishop of Luçon, became the institutional head of the establishment with the responsibility of maintaining its ecclesiastical membership. It was accepted as a French Grande Ecole by Conférence des Grandes Ecoles in 2023.

ICES has a main building, designed by the French architect Denis Laming, that was built between 1990 and 1994. The University Library was completed in 1997. A student residence was established in the abandoned convent of the Sisters of the Christian Schools of Mercy in 2000.

== Controversy ==
In May 2019, students from the university were part of a group of young people who carried out an attack on a Vendee LGBT Centre stand in La Roche-sur-Yon on the International Day Against Homophobia, Transphobia and Biphobia. The university's president Eric de Labarre condemned the attack: "We are poisoned by this minority [which is] radicalized, very politicized".

== See also ==
- Category:Academic staff of the Institut catholique d'études supérieures
