= Roger de Rabutin, comte de Bussy =

17th century French memoirist

Comte Roger de Bussy-Rabutin
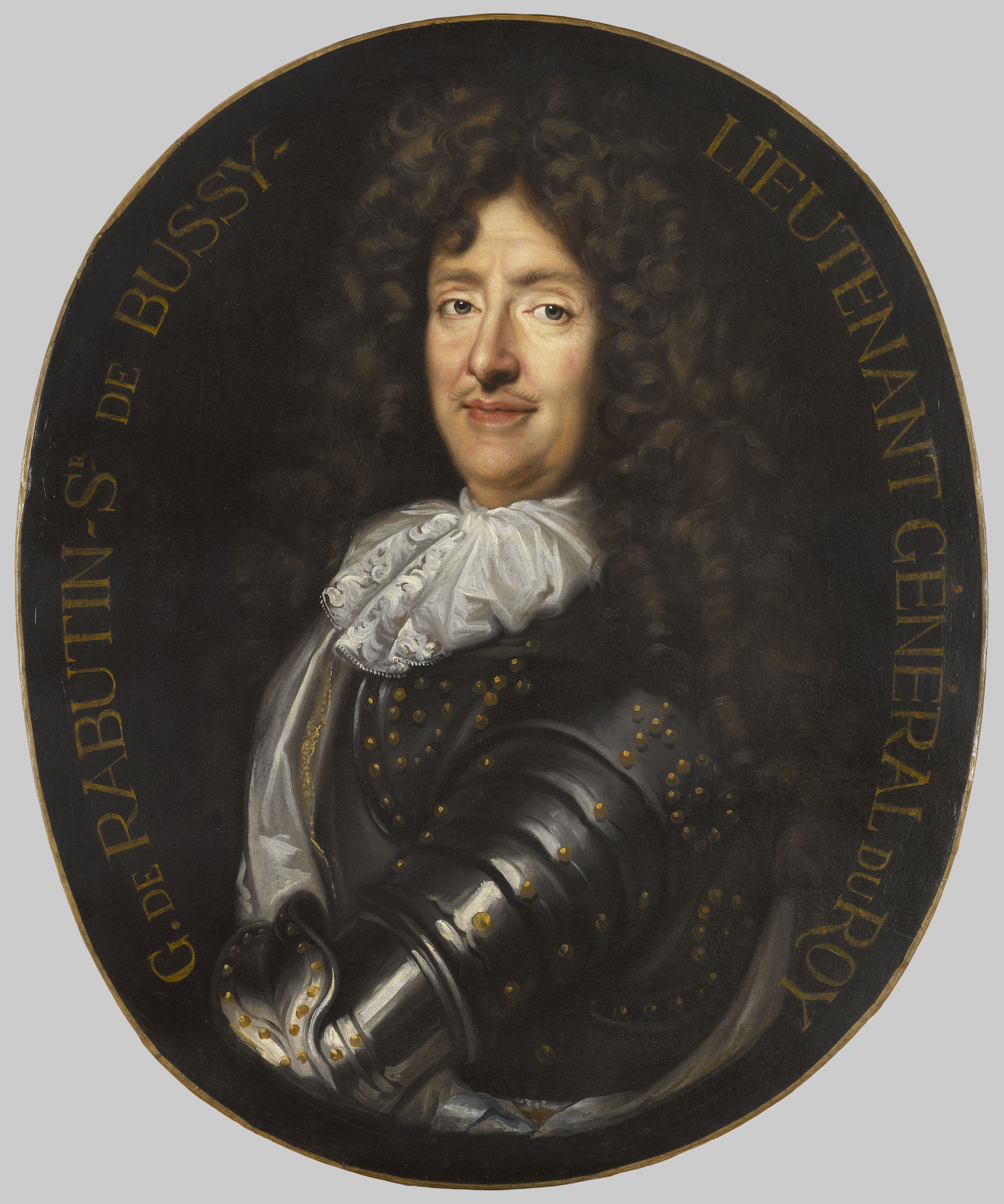
- Born: 13 April 1618; Epiry, France
- Died: 9 April 1693 (aged 74); France
- Title: Comte de Bussy
- Spouses: Gabrielle de Toulongeon, Louise de Rouville
- Children: Michel-Celse-Roger de Bussy-Rabutin
- Parents: Léonor de Rabutin (father); Diane de Cugnac (mother)

Roger de Rabutin, comte de Bussy (13 April 1618 – 9 April 1693), commonly known as Bussy-Rabutin, was a French memoirist. He was the cousin and frequent correspondent of Madame de Sévigné.

== Early life ==
Born at Epiry, near Autun, he represented a family of distinction in Burgundy, and his father, Léonor de Rabutin, was lieutenant general of the province of Nivernais.

Roger was the third son, but by the death of his elder brothers became the representative of the family. He studied first at the Jesuit school in Autun, and then at the College de Clermont. He left to enter the army when he was only sixteen and fought in several campaigns, succeeding his father in the office of mestre de camp. He participated in the 1634 siege of La Mothe-en-Bassigny in Lorraine under the direction of maréchal de La Force.He himself tells us that his two ambitions were to become "honnête homme" and to distinguish himself in arms, but luck was against him. In 1641 he was sent to the Bastille by Richelieu for some months as a punishment for neglect of his duties in his pursuit of gallantry.

In 1643 he married a cousin, Gabrielle de Toulongeon, and for a short time he left the army. But in 1645 he succeeded to his father's position in the Nivernais, and served under Condé in Catalonia. His wife died in 1646, and he became more notorious than ever through an attempt to abduct Madame de Miramion, a rich widow. This affair was settled with some difficulty by a considerable payment on Bussy's part, and he afterwards married Louise de Rouville.

== Career ==
When Condé joined the party of the Fronde, Bussy joined him, but a fancied slight on the part of the prince finally decided him for the royal side. He fought with some distinction both in the civil war and on foreign service and, buying the commission of mestre de camp in 1655, he went on to serve under Turenne in Flanders. He served there in several campaigns and distinguished himself at the Battle of the Dunes (1658) and elsewhere; but he did not get on well with his general, and his quarrelsome disposition, his overweening vanity and his habit of composing libellous chansons made him eventually the enemy of most persons of position both in the army and at court.

In 1659, he fell into disgrace for having taken part in an orgy at Roissy near Paris during Holy Week, which caused great scandal. Bussy was ordered to retire to his estates at Château de Bussy-Rabutin, and beguiled his enforced leisure by composing his famous Histoire amoureuse des Gaules (written in 1660) for the amusement of his sick mistress, Madame de Montglas. This book, a series of portraits and accounts of the intrigues of the chief ladies of the court, witty enough, but still more ill-natured, circulated freely in manuscript and had numerous spurious sequels. Although Bussy denied the charges, blaming Madame de la Baume (Catherine de Bonne, comtesse de Tallard, died 1692), a former intimate of his, it was said that he had not spared the reputations of members of the royal family, including Madame and the Queen Mother. In a letter of apology and explanation to the king Bussy claimed that a false friend who had asked to borrow it briefly (Madame de la Baume) had copied it and altered it without his knowledge. The king, angry at the report, was momentarily appeased when Bussy showed him the original manuscript to disprove the scandal, but a closed-door meeting (most likely with Madame de la Baume) sealed Bussy's fate.

He was sent to the Bastille on 17 April 1665, where he remained for more than a year, and he was only liberated on condition of retiring to his estates, where he lived in exile for 27 years. Bussy felt the disgrace keenly, but the enforced close of his military career was still more bitter. In 1682 he was allowed to revisit the court, but the coldness of his reception there made his provincial exile seem preferable and he returned to Burgundy, where he died.

He had been elected to the Académie française in 1665, and held his chair there until his death in 1693.

== Writing ==
Histoire amoureuse des Gaules drew on the work of Petronius in several of its most notable passages and became known for its critical portrayals of figures such as Madame de Sévigné and the Prince de Condé, as well as for its distinctive literary style. His posthomously published Mémoires, similarly combined lively narrative elements with aspects of historical romance. His extensive correspondence, which included many letters from Madame de Sévigné, has been regarded as one of the most significant collections of its kind in French literature.

Bussy wrote other things, of which the most important, his Genealogy of the Rabutin Family, remained in manuscript till 1867, while his Considerations sur la guerre was first published in Dresden in 1746. He also wrote a series of biographies for the use of his children, in which his own life serves a moral purpose.
