= Pouillé, Vendée =

Pouillé
- Commune
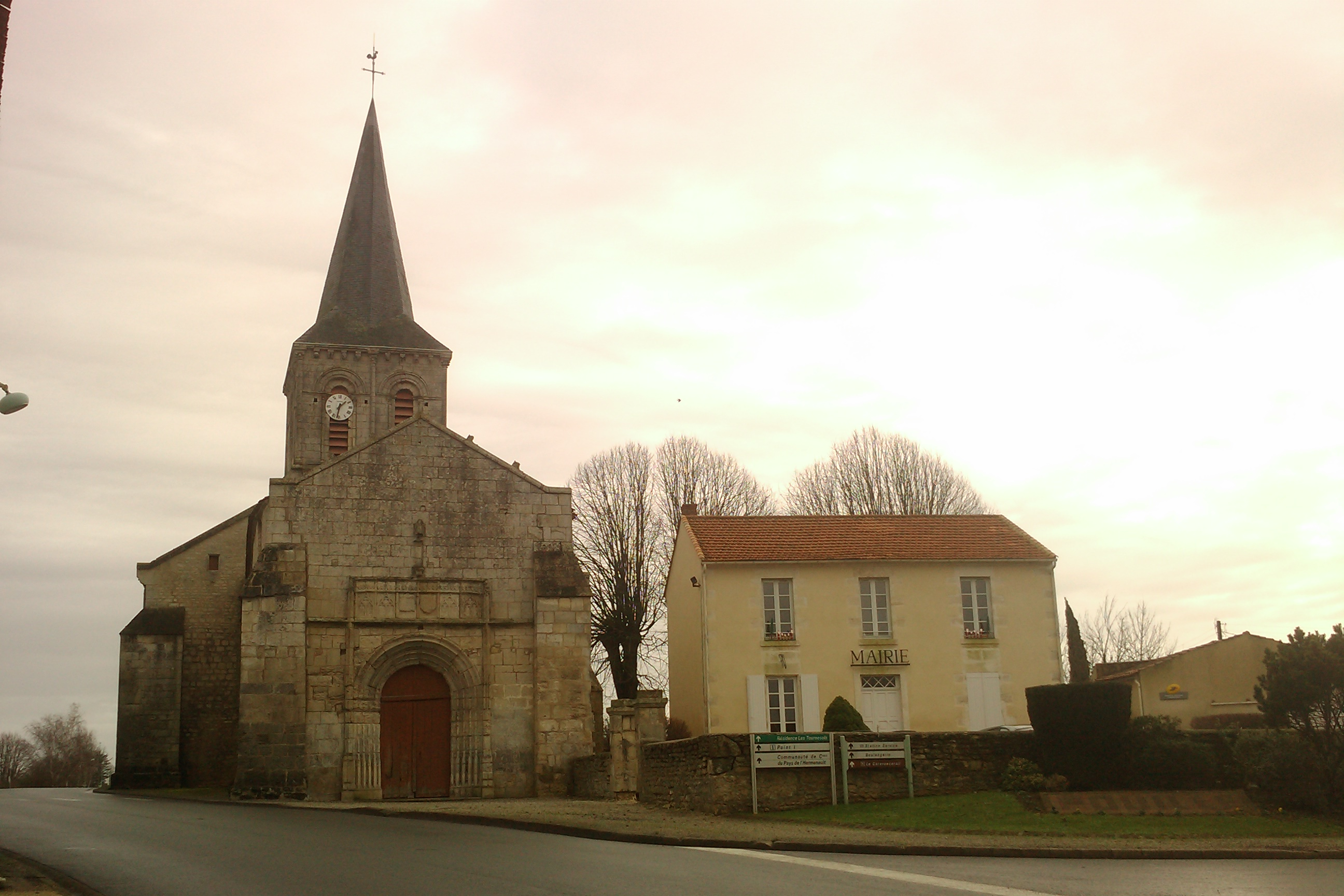
- The church of Saint-Rémi and the town hall, in Pouillé
- Location of Pouillé
- Location within France Location within Pays de la Loire
- Coordinates: 46°30′25″N 0°56′53″W
- Country: France
- Region: Pays de la Loire
- Department: Vendée
- Arrondissement: Fontenay-le-Comte
- Canton: Luçon

Government
  - Mayor (2020–2026): Dominique Mazoué
- Area^{1}: 17.48 km^{2} (6.75 sq mi)
- Highest elevation: 62 m (203 ft)
- Lowest elevation: 19 m (62 ft)
- Population (2023): 630
  - Density: 36/km^{2} (93/sq mi)
- Time zone: UTC+01:00 (CET)
  - Summer (DST): UTC+02:00 (CEST)
- INSEE/Postal code: 85181 /85570
- ^{1} French Land Register data, which excludes lakes, ponds, glaciers > 1 km^{2} (0.386 sq mi or 247 acres) and river estuaries.

Pouillé (French pronunciation: [puje]) is a commune in the Vendée department in the Pays de la Loire region in western France.

== See also ==
- Communes of the Vendée department
