= Saint-Denis-du-Payré =

- Commune
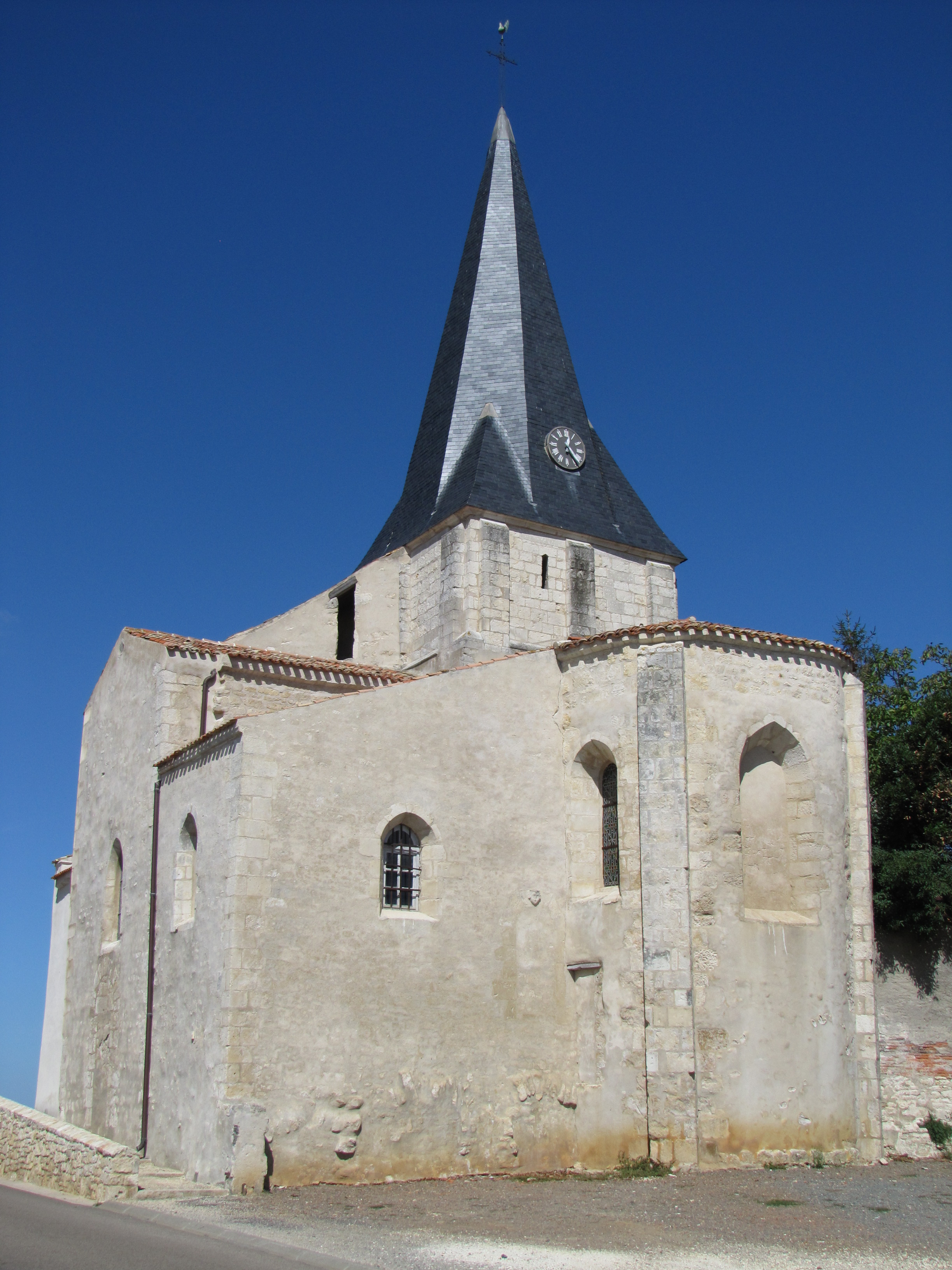
- The church in Saint-Denis-du-Payré
- Location of Saint-Denis-du-Payré
- Location within France Location within Pays de la Loire
- Coordinates: 46°24′29″N 1°16′03″W
- Country: France
- Region: Pays de la Loire
- Department: Vendée
- Arrondissement: Fontenay-le-Comte
- Canton: Luçon

Government
  - Mayor (2020–2026): Gaëlle Fleury
- Area^{1}: 16.24 km^{2} (6.27 sq mi)
- Highest elevation: 29 m (95 ft)
- Lowest elevation: 1 m (3.3 ft)
- Population (2023): 434
  - Density: 26.7/km^{2} (69.2/sq mi)
- Time zone: UTC+01:00 (CET)
  - Summer (DST): UTC+02:00 (CEST)
- INSEE/Postal code: 85207 /85580
- ^{1} French Land Register data, which excludes lakes, ponds, glaciers > 1 km^{2} (0.386 sq mi or 247 acres) and river estuaries.

Saint-Denis-du-Payré (French pronunciation: [sɛ̃ dəni dy pɛʁe]) is a commune in the Vendée department in the Pays de la Loire region in western France.

The grasslands in the Natural Reserve of St-Denis-du-Payré has a protected colony of maritime Iris.

== See also ==
- Communes of the Vendée department
