= Lairoux =

- Commune
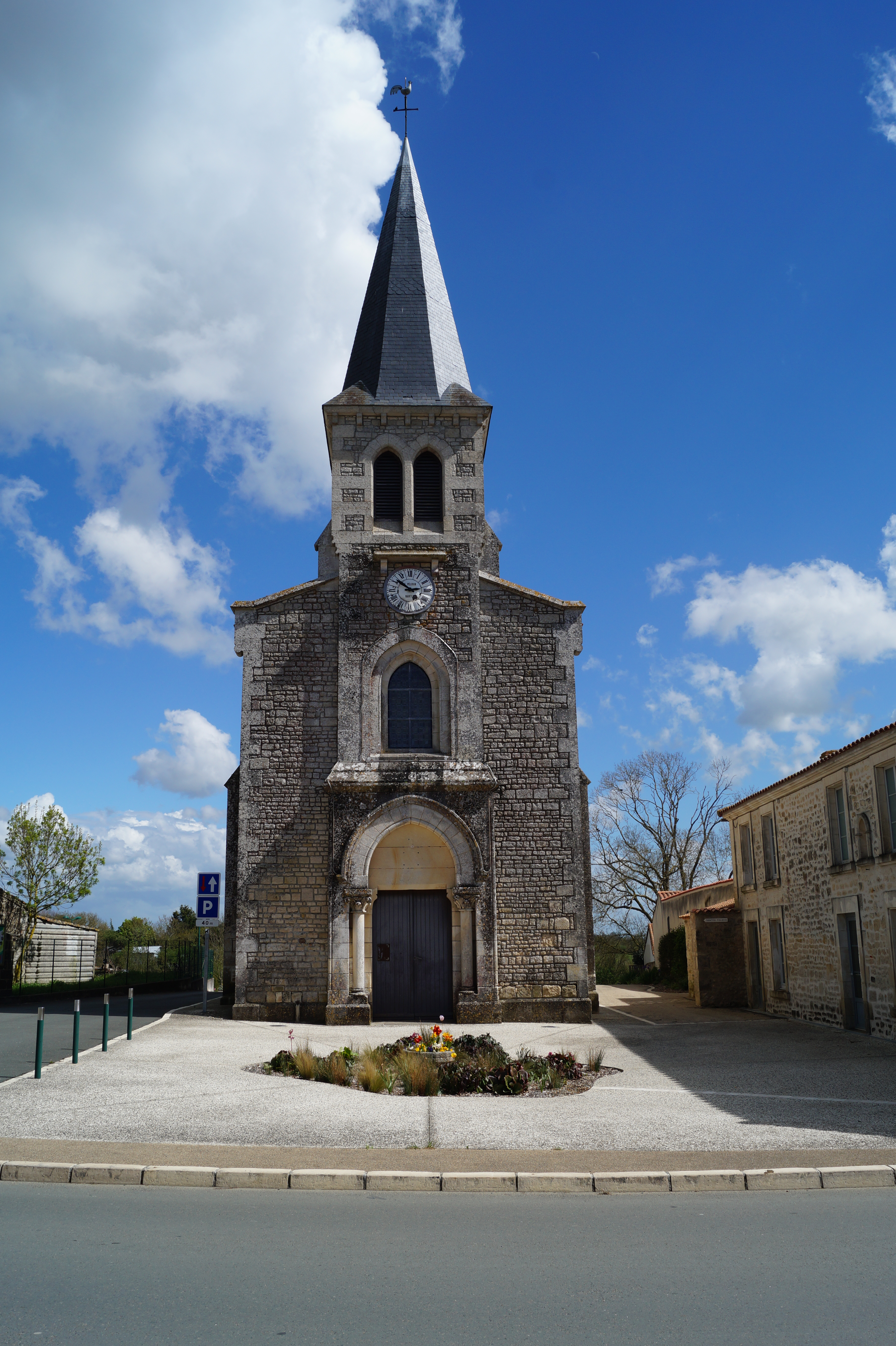
- Location of Lairoux
- Location within France Location within Pays de la Loire
- Coordinates: 46°26′55″N 1°15′56″W
- Country: France
- Region: Pays de la Loire
- Department: Vendée
- Arrondissement: Fontenay-le-Comte
- Canton: Luçon

Government
  - Mayor (2020–2026): Cédric Guinaudeau
- Area^{1}: 13.19 km^{2} (5.09 sq mi)
- Highest elevation: 32 m (105 ft)
- Lowest elevation: 0 m (0 ft)
- Population (2023): 602
  - Density: 45.6/km^{2} (118/sq mi)
- Time zone: UTC+01:00 (CET)
  - Summer (DST): UTC+02:00 (CEST)
- INSEE/Postal code: 85117 /85400
- ^{1} French Land Register data, which excludes lakes, ponds, glaciers > 1 km^{2} (0.386 sq mi or 247 acres) and river estuaries.

Lairoux (French pronunciation: [lɛʁu]) is a commune in the Vendée department in the Pays de la Loire region in western France.

== Geography ==
The river Lay forms all of the commune's western border.

== See also ==
- Communes of the Vendée department
