= Michel-Celse-Roger de Bussy-Rabutin =

French bishop and diplomat (1669–1736)

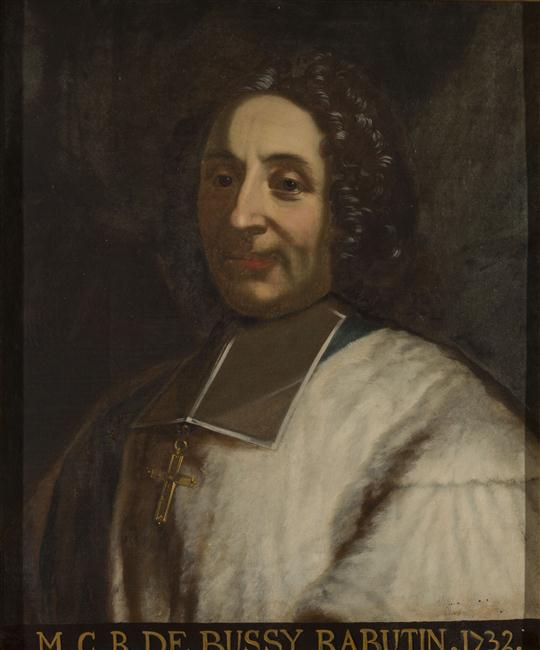

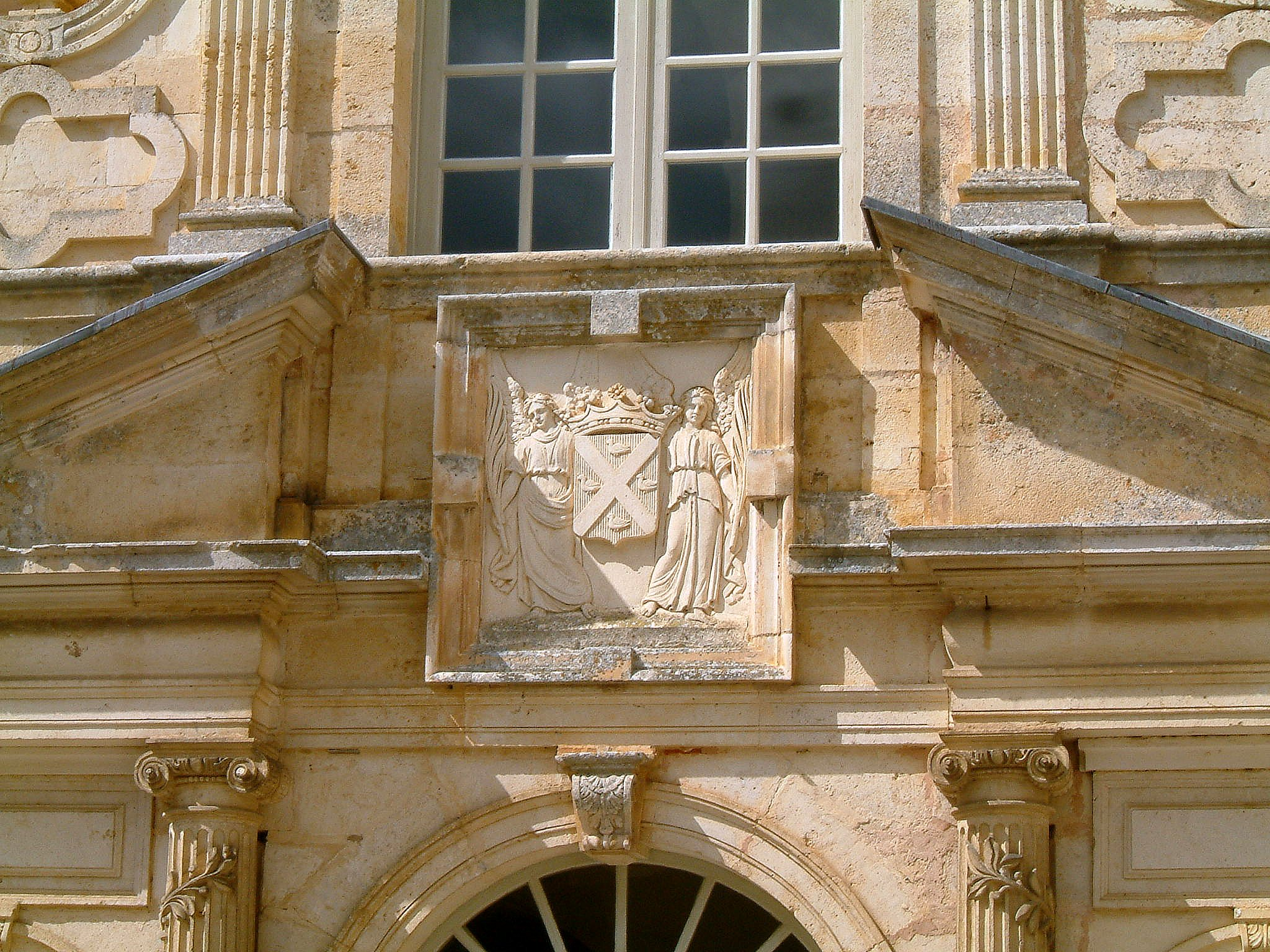
Rabutin arms displayed at the Château de Bussy

Michel-Celse-Roger de Bussy-Rabutin (1669 – 3 November 1736) was a French churchman and diplomat.

== Biography ==
The second son of Count Roger de Bussy-Rabutin, he served as Bishop of Luçon from 1723 until his death. He attended the salon of Madame de Tencin; he was elected to the Académie française on 21 February 1732, without having written a single work, being sponsored into the French Academy by Fontenelle the following 6 March. In 1735 he commissioned a portrait of himself by Hyacinthe Rigaud without knowing how he would pay for it – the artist's accounting books state "Monsieur the Bishop of Luçon, Bussy-Rabutin. Remains half-finished.".

== See also ==
- List of Ambassadors of France to the United Kingdom

Preceded by Jean-François de l'Escure de Valderil	Bishop of Luçon; 1723–1736	Succeeded by Samuel-Guillaume de Verthamon de Chavagnac
