= Les Magnils-Reigniers =

- Commune
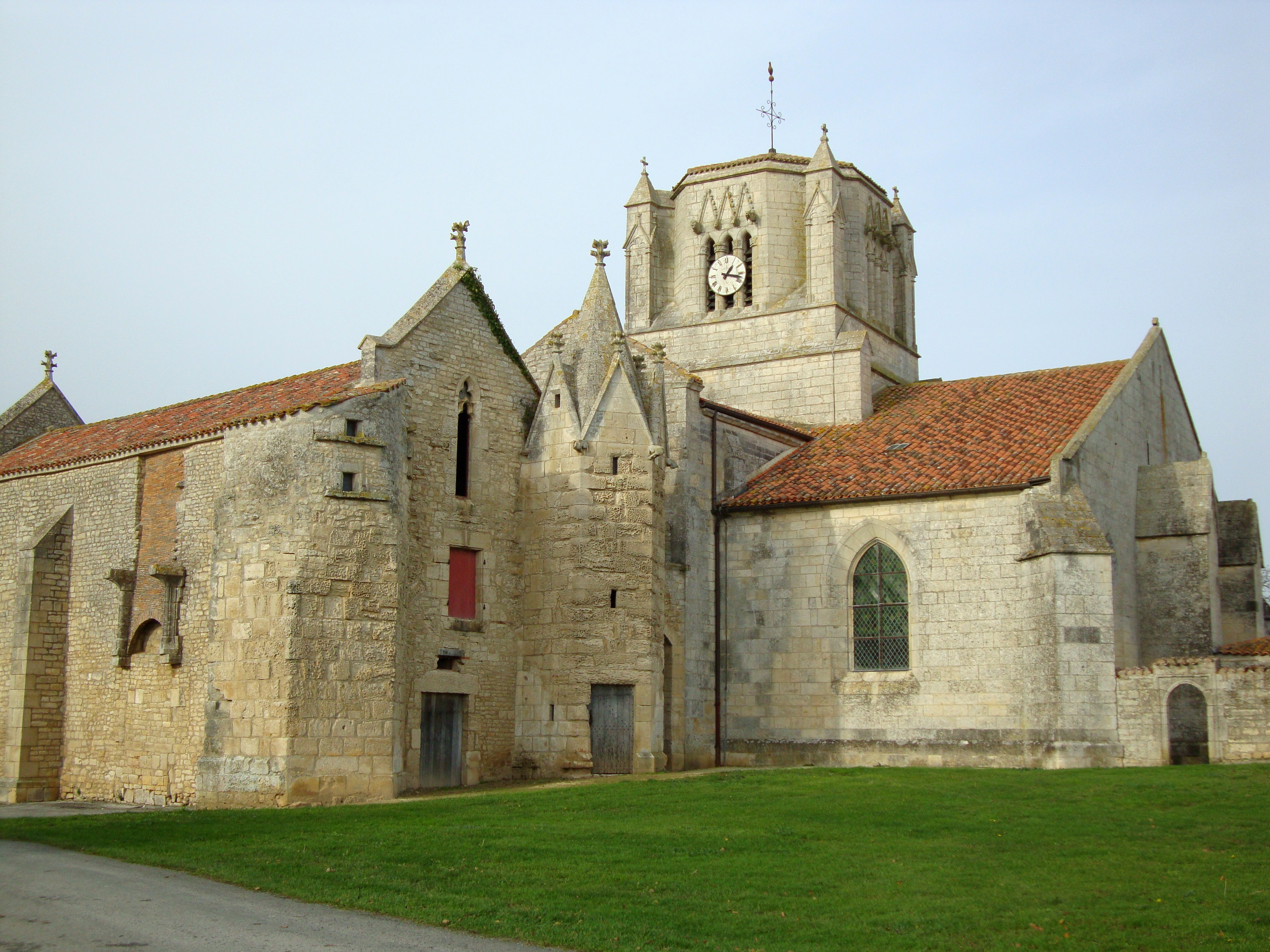
- The church of Saint-Nicolas, in Magnils-Reigniers
- Location of Les Magnils-Reigniers
- Location within France Location within Pays de la Loire
- Coordinates: 46°28′47″N 1°13′09″W
- Country: France
- Region: Pays de la Loire
- Department: Vendée
- Arrondissement: Fontenay-le-Comte
- Canton: Luçon
- Intercommunality: Sud Vendée Littoral

Government
  - Mayor (2020–2026): Nicolas Vannier
- Area^{1}: 17.96 km^{2} (6.93 sq mi)
- Highest elevation: 36 m (118 ft)
- Lowest elevation: 0 m (0 ft)
- Population (2023): 1,486
  - Density: 82.74/km^{2} (214.3/sq mi)
- Time zone: UTC+01:00 (CET)
  - Summer (DST): UTC+02:00 (CEST)
- INSEE/Postal code: 85131 /85400
- ^{1} French Land Register data, which excludes lakes, ponds, glaciers > 1 km^{2} (0.386 sq mi or 247 acres) and river estuaries.

Les Magnils-Reigniers (French pronunciation: [le maɲil ʁɛɲe]) is a commune in the Vendée department in the Pays de la Loire region in western France.

== See also ==
- Communes of the Vendée department
