= Champagné-les-Marais =

- Commune
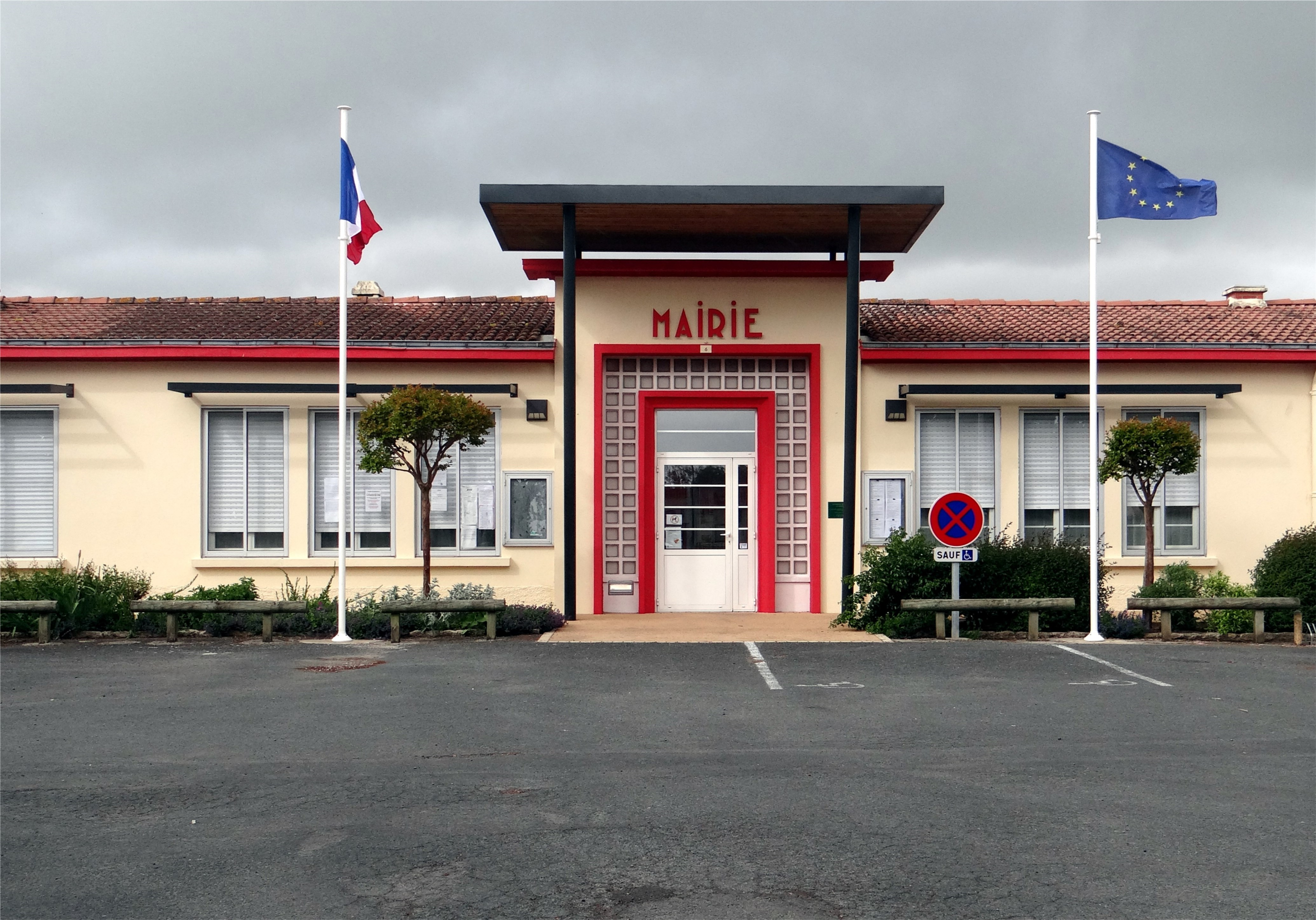
- The town hall in Champagné-les-Marais
- Location of Champagné-les-Marais
- Location within France Location within Pays de la Loire
- Coordinates: 46°22′54″N 1°07′21″W
- Country: France
- Region: Pays de la Loire
- Department: Vendée
- Arrondissement: Fontenay-le-Comte
- Canton: Luçon

Government
  - Mayor (2020–2026): Bernard Landais
- Area^{1}: 49.82 km^{2} (19.24 sq mi)
- Highest elevation: 6 m (20 ft)
- Lowest elevation: 0 m (0 ft)
- Population (2023): 1,824
  - Density: 36.61/km^{2} (94.82/sq mi)
- Time zone: UTC+01:00 (CET)
  - Summer (DST): UTC+02:00 (CEST)
- INSEE/Postal code: 85049 /85450
- ^{1} French Land Register data, which excludes lakes, ponds, glaciers > 1 km^{2} (0.386 sq mi or 247 acres) and river estuaries.

Champagné-les-Marais (French pronunciation: [ʃɑ̃paɲe le maʁɛ]) is a commune in the Vendée department in the Pays de la Loire region in western France.

== See also ==
- Communes of the Vendée department
