= L'Île-d'Elle =

- Commune
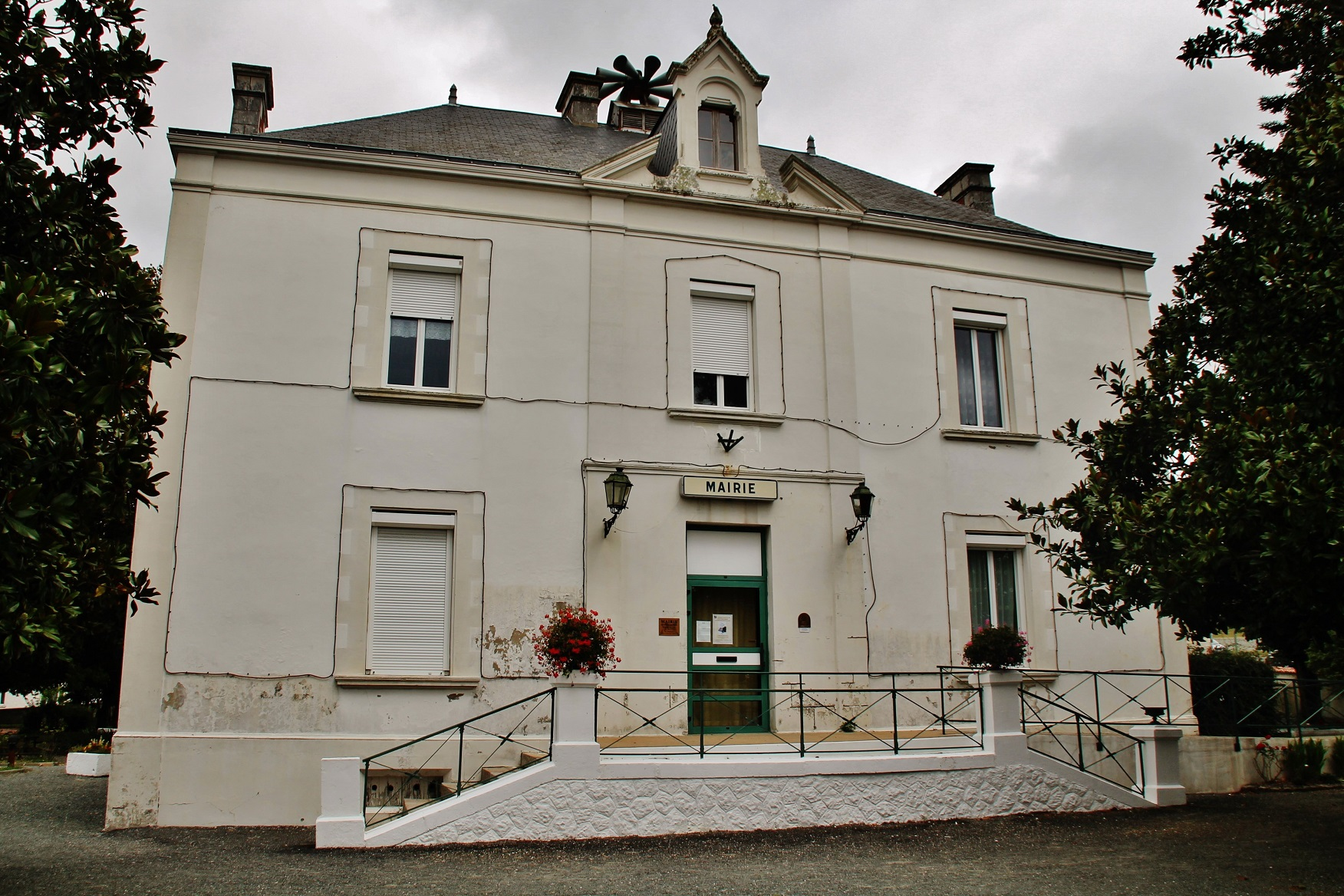
- The town hall in L'Île-d'Elle

- Coat of arms
- Location of L'Île-d'Elle
- Location within France Location within Pays de la Loire
- Coordinates: 46°19′54″N 0°56′53″W
- Country: France
- Region: Pays de la Loire
- Department: Vendée
- Arrondissement: Fontenay-le-Comte
- Canton: Luçon
- Intercommunality: Sud Vendée Littoral

Government
  - Mayor (2020–2026): Joël Bluteau
- Area^{1}: 19.09 km^{2} (7.37 sq mi)
- Highest elevation: 30 m (98 ft)
- Lowest elevation: 1 m (3.3 ft)
- Population (2023): 1,502
  - Density: 78.68/km^{2} (203.8/sq mi)
- Time zone: UTC+01:00 (CET)
  - Summer (DST): UTC+02:00 (CEST)
- INSEE/Postal code: 85111 /85770
- ^{1} French Land Register data, which excludes lakes, ponds, glaciers > 1 km^{2} (0.386 sq mi or 247 acres) and river estuaries.

L'Île-d'Elle (French pronunciation: [lil dɛl]) is a commune in the Vendée department in the Pays de la Loire region in western France.

== See also ==
- Communes of the Vendée department
