= Puyravault, Vendée =

Puyravault
- Commune
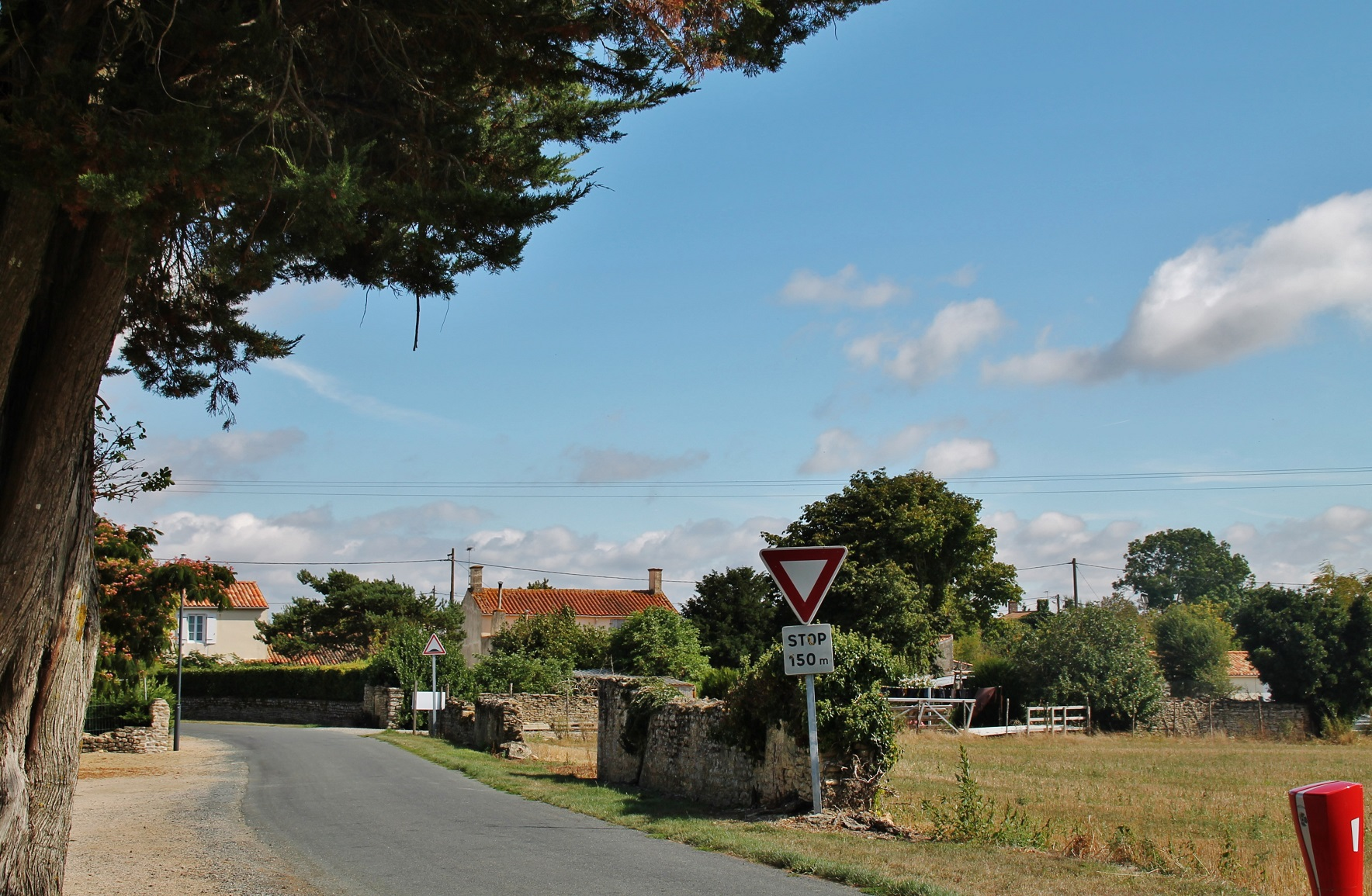
- The road into Puyravault
- Location of Puyravault
- Location within France Location within Pays de la Loire
- Coordinates: 46°22′45″N 1°04′51″W
- Country: France
- Region: Pays de la Loire
- Department: Vendée
- Arrondissement: Fontenay-le-Comte
- Canton: Luçon

Government
  - Mayor (2020–2026): Charlotte Vigneux
- Area^{1}: 17.07 km^{2} (6.59 sq mi)
- Highest elevation: 7 m (23 ft)
- Lowest elevation: 0 m (0 ft)
- Population (2023): 642
  - Density: 37.6/km^{2} (97.4/sq mi)
- Time zone: UTC+01:00 (CET)
  - Summer (DST): UTC+02:00 (CEST)
- INSEE/Postal code: 85185 /85450
- ^{1} French Land Register data, which excludes lakes, ponds, glaciers > 1 km^{2} (0.386 sq mi or 247 acres) and river estuaries.

Puyravault (French pronunciation: [pɥiʁavo]) is a commune in the Vendée department in the Pays de la Loire region in western France.

== See also ==
- Communes of the Vendée department
