= Nalliers, Vendée =

Nalliers
- Commune
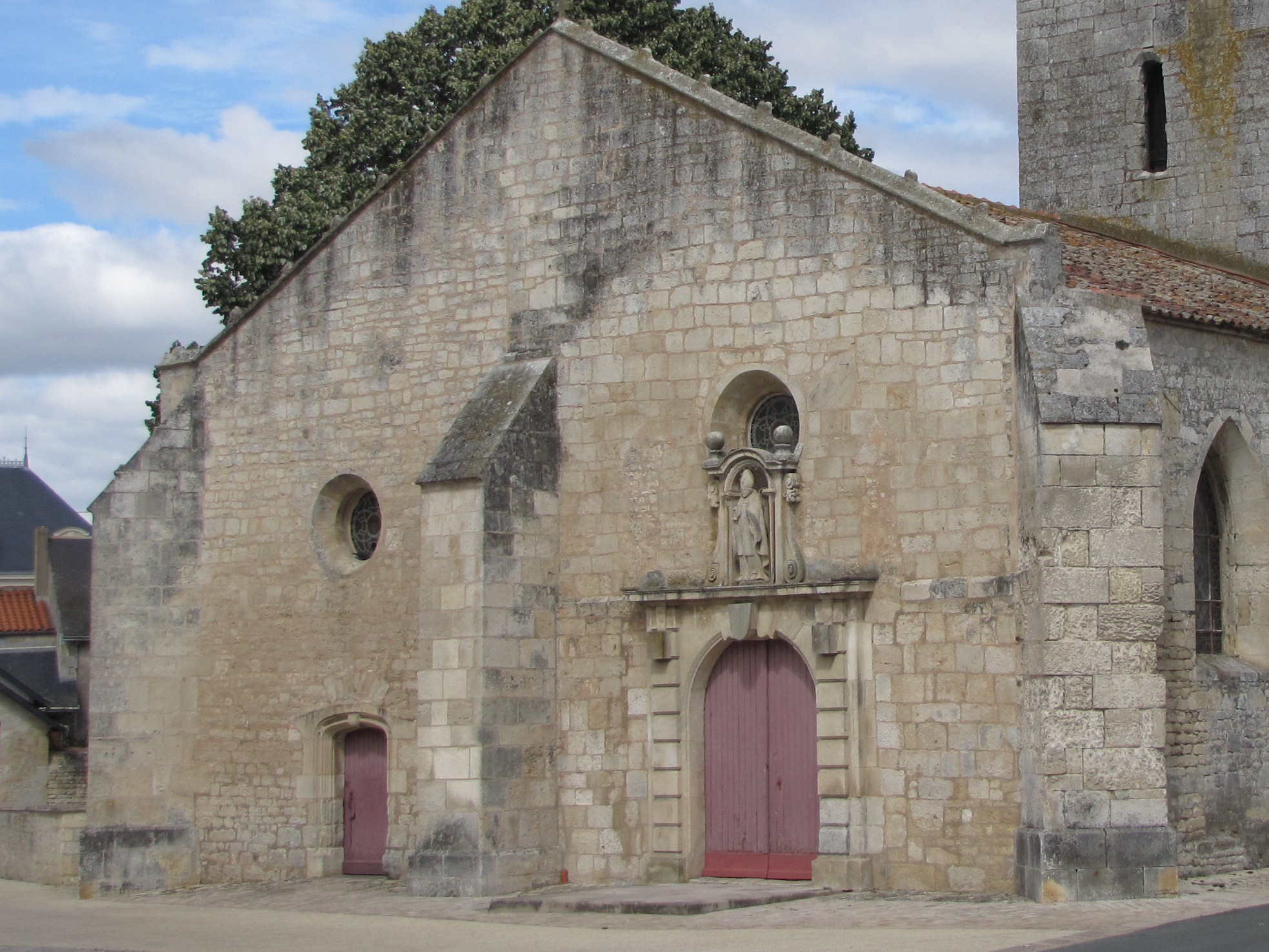
- The church in Nalliers

- Coat of arms
- Location of Nalliers
- Location within France Location within Pays de la Loire
- Coordinates: 46°28′17″N 1°01′39″W
- Country: France
- Region: Pays de la Loire
- Department: Vendée
- Arrondissement: Fontenay-le-Comte
- Canton: Luçon

Government
  - Mayor (2020–2026): Bruno Fabre
- Area^{1}: 33.61 km^{2} (12.98 sq mi)
- Highest elevation: 44 m (144 ft)
- Lowest elevation: 1 m (3.3 ft)
- Population (2023): 2,389
  - Density: 71.08/km^{2} (184.1/sq mi)
- Time zone: UTC+01:00 (CET)
  - Summer (DST): UTC+02:00 (CEST)
- INSEE/Postal code: 85159 /85370
- ^{1} French Land Register data, which excludes lakes, ponds, glaciers > 1 km^{2} (0.386 sq mi or 247 acres) and river estuaries.

Nalliers (French pronunciation: [nalje]) is a commune in the Vendée department in the Pays de la Loire region in western France.

== Population ==
Historical population
| Year | Pop. | ±% p.a. |
|---|---|---|
| 1968 | 1,856 | — |
| 1975 | 1,749 | −0.84% |
| 1982 | 1,716 | −0.27% |
| 1990 | 1,763 | +0.34% |
| 1999 | 1,880 | +0.72% |
| 2007 | 2,133 | +1.59% |
| 2012 | 2,277 | +1.32% |
| 2017 | 2,315 | +0.33% |
| 2023 | 2,389 | +0.53% |
Source: INSEE

== See also ==
- Communes of the Vendée department
