= Canton of Luçon =

Coordinates: 46.46°N 1.17°W

The canton of Luçon is an administrative division of the Vendée department, western France. Its borders were modified at the French canton reorganisation which came into effect in March 2015. Its seat is in Luçon.

It consists of the following communes:

1. Chaillé-les-Marais
2. Champagné-les-Marais
3. Chasnais
4. Grues
5. Le Gué-de-Velluire
6. L'Île-d'Elle
7. Lairoux
8. Luçon
9. Les Magnils-Reigniers
10. Moreilles
11. Mouzeuil-Saint-Martin
12. Nalliers
13. Pouillé
14. Puyravault
15. Saint-Denis-du-Payré
16. Sainte-Gemme-la-Plaine
17. Sainte-Radégonde-des-Noyers
18. Saint-Michel-en-l'Herm
19. La Taillée
20. Triaize
21. Vouillé-les-Marais
