= Mouzeuil-Saint-Martin =

- Commune
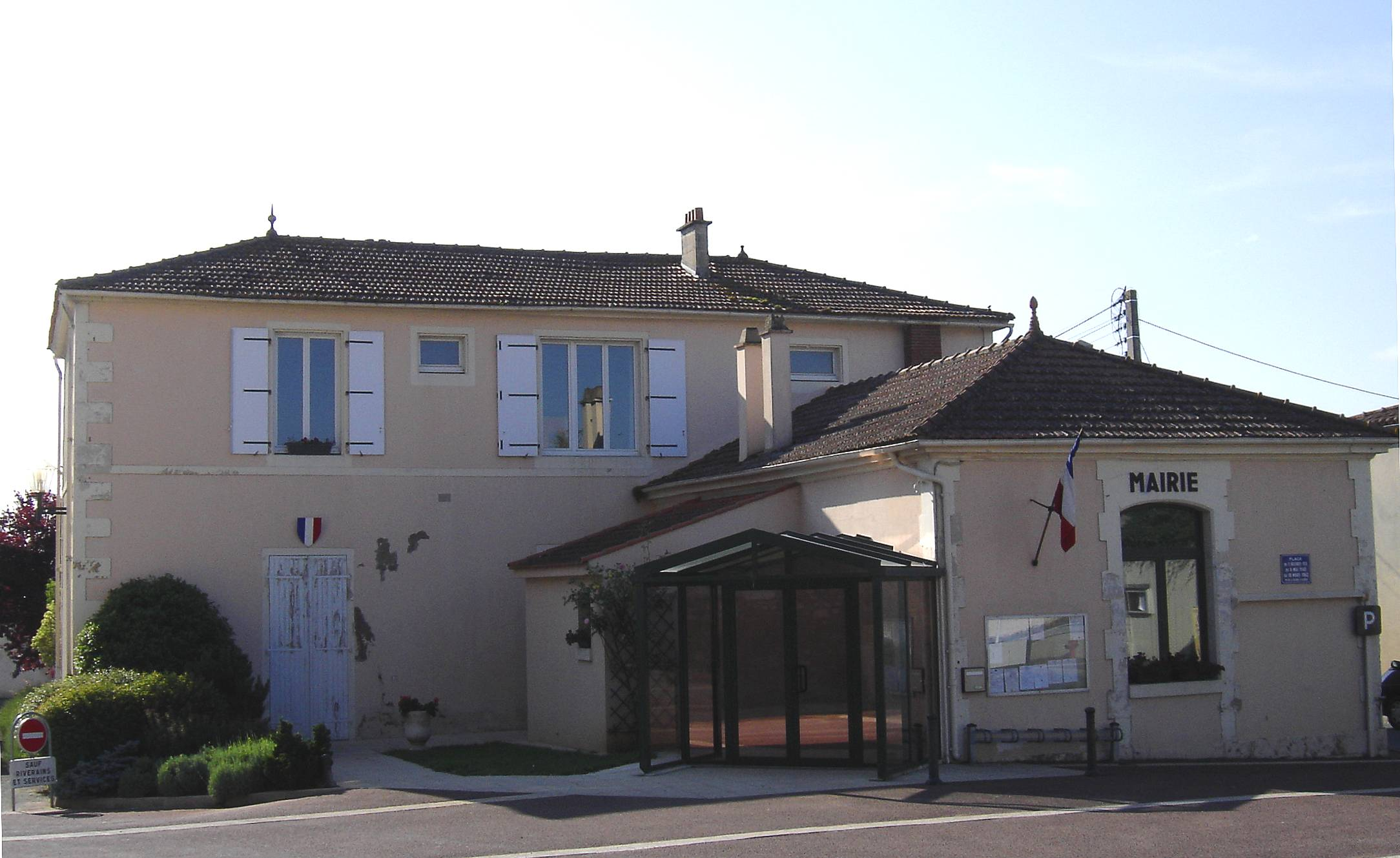
- The town hall in Mouzeuil-Saint-Martin
- Location of Mouzeuil-Saint-Martin
- Location within France Location within Pays de la Loire
- Coordinates: 46°28′01″N 0°59′01″W
- Country: France
- Region: Pays de la Loire
- Department: Vendée
- Arrondissement: Fontenay-le-Comte
- Canton: Luçon

Government
  - Mayor (2025–2026): Roger Bernard
- Area^{1}: 25.85 km^{2} (9.98 sq mi)
- Highest elevation: 44 m (144 ft)
- Lowest elevation: 1 m (3.3 ft)
- Population (2023): 1,233
  - Density: 47.70/km^{2} (123.5/sq mi)
- Time zone: UTC+01:00 (CET)
  - Summer (DST): UTC+02:00 (CEST)
- INSEE/Postal code: 85158 /85370
- ^{1} French Land Register data, which excludes lakes, ponds, glaciers > 1 km^{2} (0.386 sq mi or 247 acres) and river estuaries.

Mouzeuil-Saint-Martin (French pronunciation: [muzœj sɛ̃ maʁtɛ̃]) is a commune in the Vendée department in the Pays de la Loire region in western France.

== See also ==
- Communes of the Vendée department
