= Grues, Vendée =

Grues
- Commune
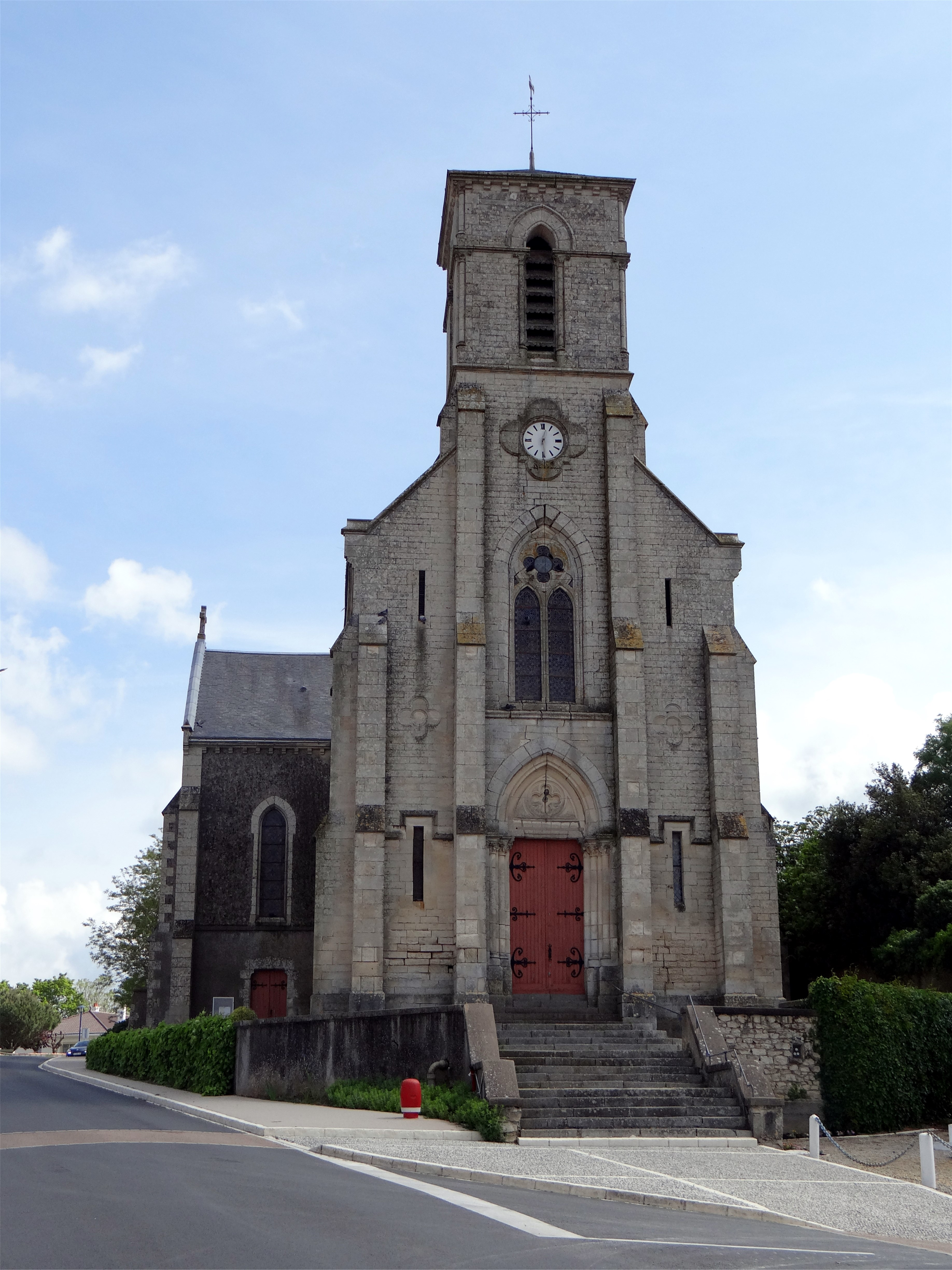
- The church of Saint-Nicolas, in Grues
- Location of Grues
- Location within France Location within Pays de la Loire
- Coordinates: 46°23′59″N 1°18′11″W
- Country: France
- Region: Pays de la Loire
- Department: Vendée
- Arrondissement: Fontenay-le-Comte
- Canton: Luçon

Government
  - Mayor (2020–2026): Gilles Wattiau
- Area^{1}: 47.18 km^{2} (18.22 sq mi)
- Highest elevation: 15 m (49 ft)
- Lowest elevation: 1 m (3.3 ft)
- Population (2023): 927
  - Density: 19.6/km^{2} (50.9/sq mi)
- Time zone: UTC+01:00 (CET)
  - Summer (DST): UTC+02:00 (CEST)
- INSEE/Postal code: 85104 /85580
- ^{1} French Land Register data, which excludes lakes, ponds, glaciers > 1 km^{2} (0.386 sq mi or 247 acres) and river estuaries.

Grues (French pronunciation: [ɡʁy]) is a commune in the Vendée department in the Pays de la Loire region in western France.

== Geography ==
The river Lay forms most of the commune's western border.

== See also ==
- Communes of the Vendée department
