= Marie de Miramion =

French religious figure (1629–1696)

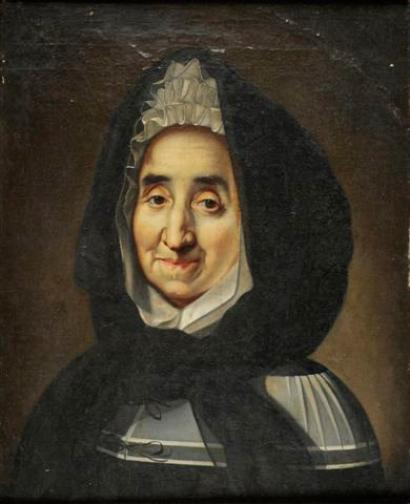
Madame de Miramion.jpg

Marie de Miramion, also known as Marie Bonneau, or Marie Bonneau de Rubella Beauharnais de Miramion (1629–1696), was a French religious figure, known for her piety and the organizations she founded.

== Life ==
Marie de Miramion was the daughter of Jacques Bonneau, seigneur de Rubelles, conseiller et secretaire du roi. Her mother died when Marie was nine years old. Left a widower with five small children, her father deemed it prudent to join the household of his brother, M. de Bonneau, Seigneur of Plessis and Valmar. There she came to love dancing and the theatre.

Marie is described as a beautiful young woman, with an alabaster complexion, chestnut hair, and dark blue eyes. Upon the death of her father, when she was fifteen, her aunt and uncle took on the responsibility of arranging an appropriate marriage. On 27 April 1645 she married twenty-seven-year-old Jean-Jacques de Beauharnais, seigneur de Miramion, conseiller du roi en sa cour du Parlement de Paris, who later fell ill of a fever and died the same year. They had one child, a daughter also named Marie.

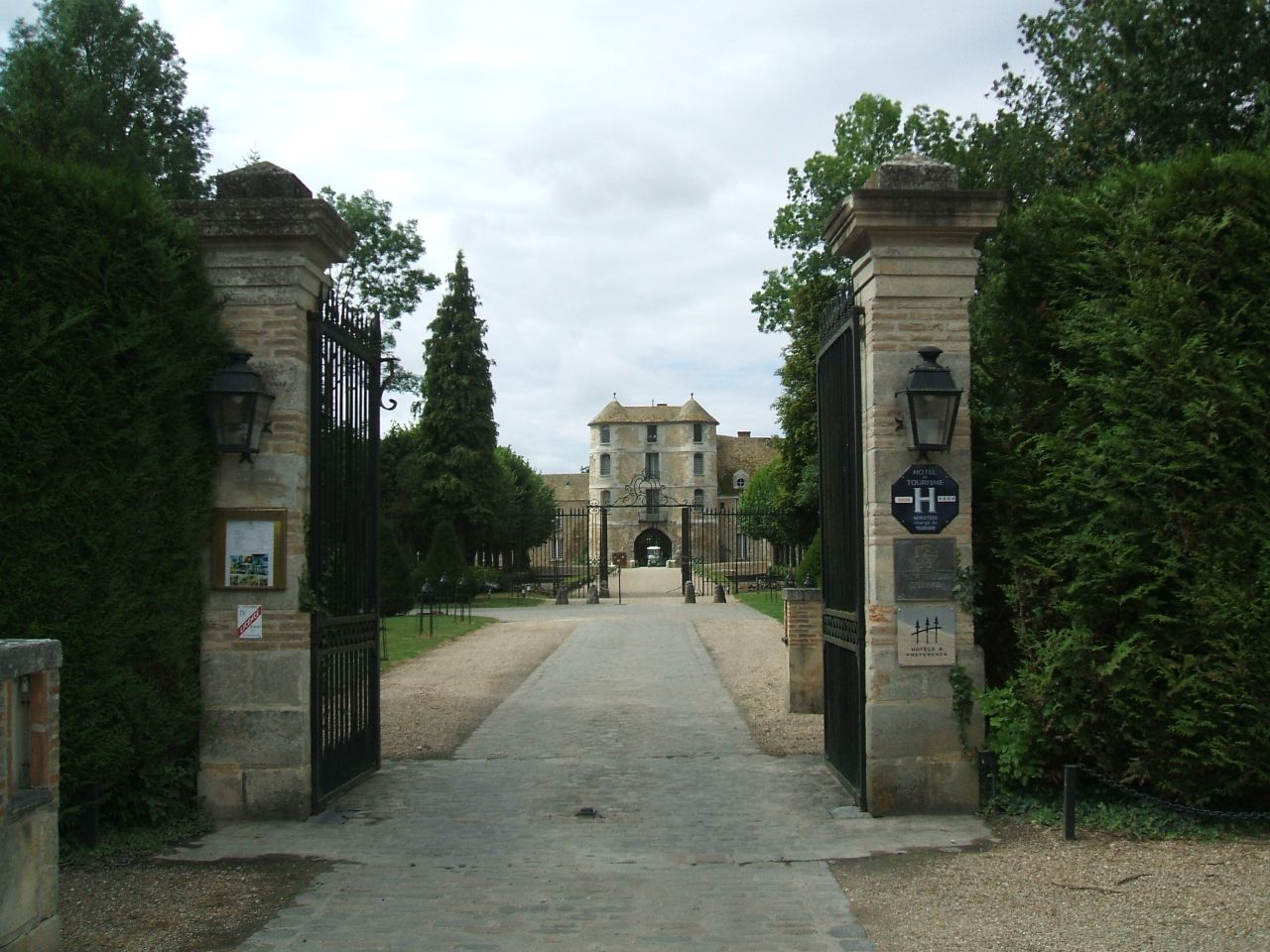
Chateau de Launay Villiers-le-Mahieu Entrance

Two years later Marie contracted smallpox but recovered. Her young daughter suffered from a serious chest ailment. Fearing the loss of her only child, Marie vowed that if the child recovered, she would make a pilgrimage to the Chapel of St. Valerian. The following August, Marie, accompanied by her mother-in-law and attendants, were waylaid en route by individuals in the employ of a would-be suitor. Her traveling companions were left in the woods and the coach driven post haste to the fortress Chateau de Launay, owned by Count Roger de Bussy-Rabutin, a notorious libertine. But Bussy-Rabutin was forced to free her when Marie refused to take either food or water until released. He had also received word that the Queen Regent of France, upon learning that a lady of the court had been abducted by one of the court nobles, had ordered an armed regiment of soldiers to rescue her. Nor did he have the support of his men, who had been under the impression that the abduction had been a ruse staged for the benefit of the lady's family.

Her daughter was put to board at the convent of the Visitation, on the Rue de St. Antoine, where Marie also lived for part of the year. It was not unusual at that time, for ladies to retire for weeks or even months to religious houses to practice prayer and enjoy a period of pious solitude. Her family saw this as a precaution against any second attempt on the part of Bussy-Rabutin. In 1649, Marie made a vow of chastity following a retreat at the motherhouse of the Filles de la Charite and took up the life of a lay devote. She formed a group of girls to teach school and care for the sick in her parish and later combined them with another group of devotes under the name of the "Filles de Sainte-Genevieve". In addition, she founded an orphanage; a refuge for endangered girls (later absorbed into the Hopital General); and a retreat house. After 1678, she served as a lay superior of the Filles de la Providence. She is remembered as a founder of one of the teaching orders.
