= Luçon Cathedral =

- Cathedral of Notre Dame of the Assumption
- French: La cathédrale Notre-Dame de l'Assomption
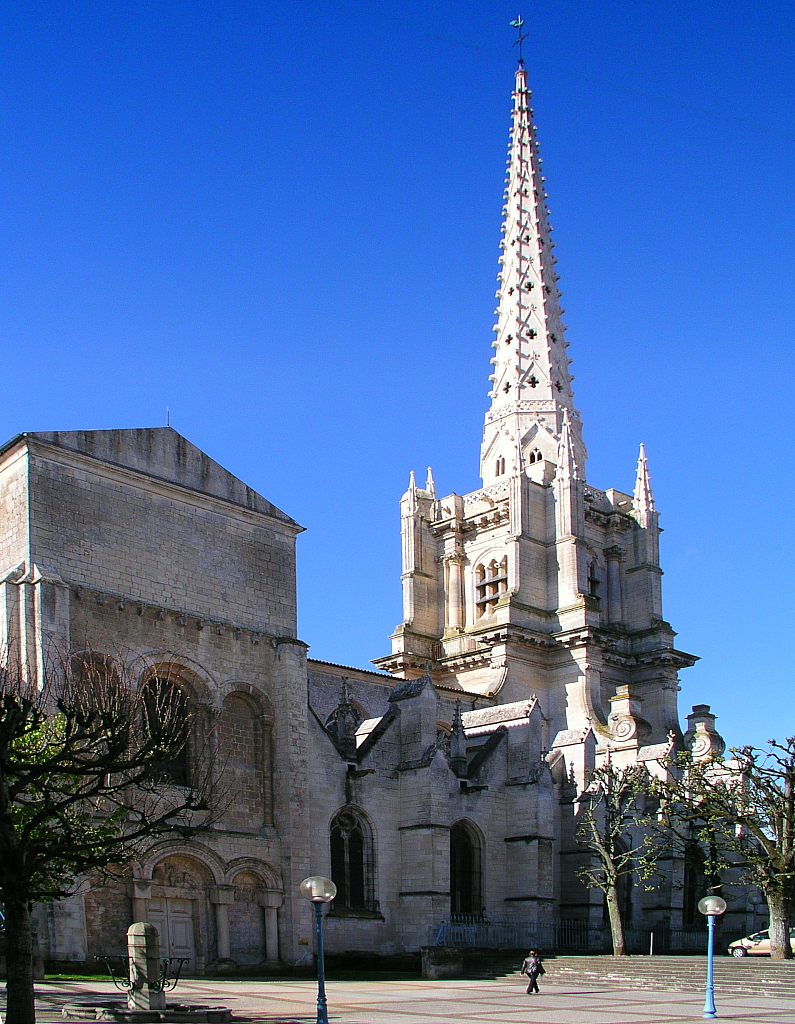
- Luçon Cathedral
- 46°27′16″N 1°10′0″W
- Location: Luçon, Vendée
- Country: France
- Denomination: Roman Catholic Church
- Website: Website

History
- Status: Cathedral

Architecture
- Architectural type: church
- Style: Gothic
- Years built: 1091-1121; 16th century (extensions)

Administration
- Province: Rennes
- Diocese: Luçon

Luçon Cathedral (French: Cathédrale Notre-Dame-de-l'Assomption de Luçon) is a Roman Catholic church located in Luçon in the Vendée, France. The cathedral is a national monument, together with the cloister and the bishop's palace. It is the seat of the Diocese of Luçon, which covers the Vendée department.
