= Le Gué-de-Velluire =

- Commune
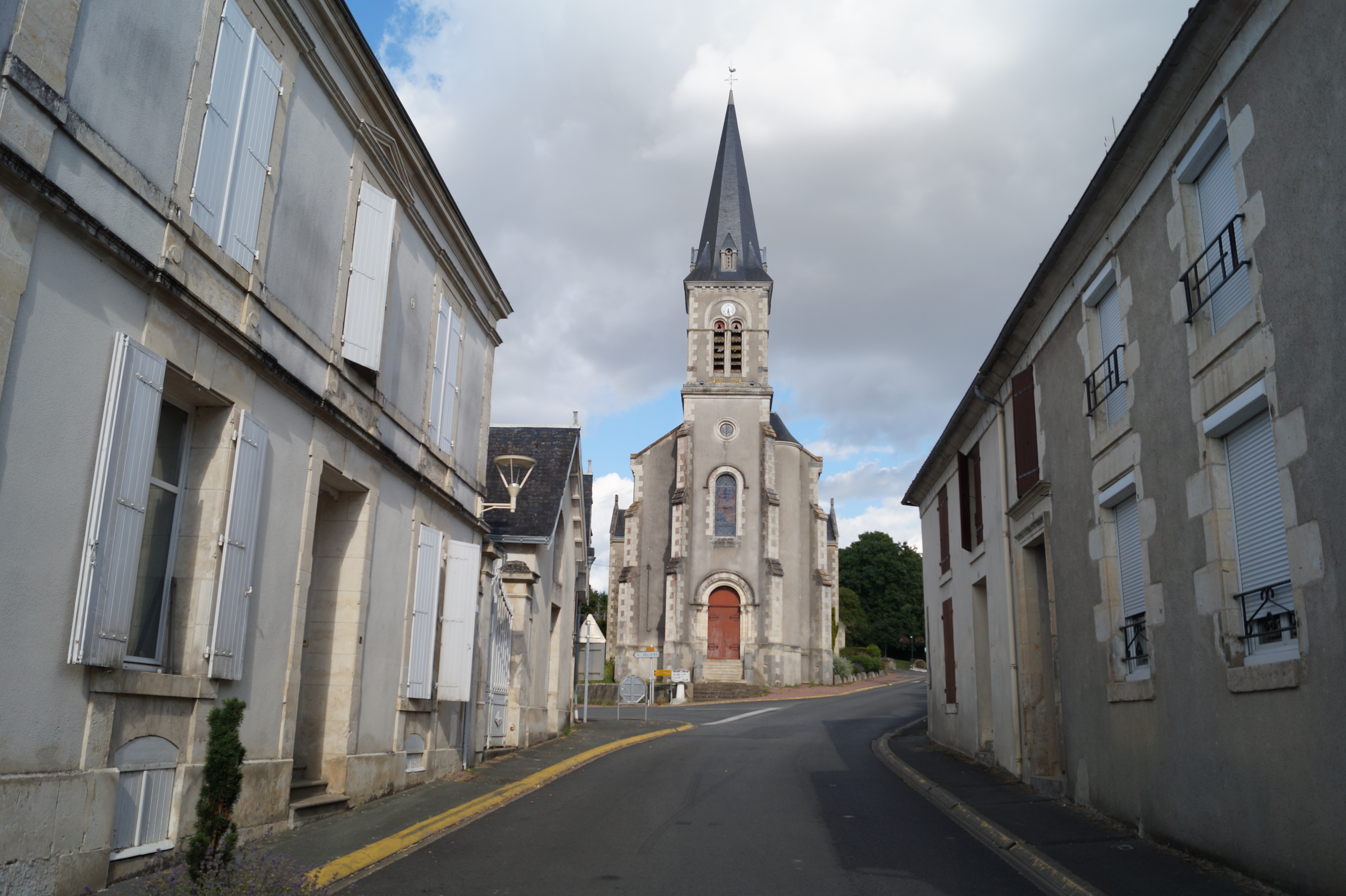

- Coat of arms
- Location of Le Gué-de-Velluire
- Location within France Location within Pays de la Loire
- Coordinates: 46°22′28″N 0°55′16″W
- Country: France
- Region: Pays de la Loire
- Department: Vendée
- Arrondissement: Fontenay-le-Comte
- Canton: Luçon

Government
  - Mayor (2020–2026): Joseph Marquis
- Area^{1}: 12.81 km^{2} (4.95 sq mi)
- Highest elevation: 39 m (128 ft)
- Lowest elevation: 0 m (0 ft)
- Population (2023): 525
  - Density: 41.0/km^{2} (106/sq mi)
- Time zone: UTC+01:00 (CET)
  - Summer (DST): UTC+02:00 (CEST)
- INSEE/Postal code: 85105 /85770
- ^{1} French Land Register data, which excludes lakes, ponds, glaciers > 1 km^{2} (0.386 sq mi or 247 acres) and river estuaries.

Le Gué-de-Velluire (French pronunciation: [lə ɡe də vɛlɥiʁ]) is a commune in the Vendée department in the Pays de la Loire region in western France.

== See also ==
- Communes of the Vendée department
