= Chasnais =

- Commune
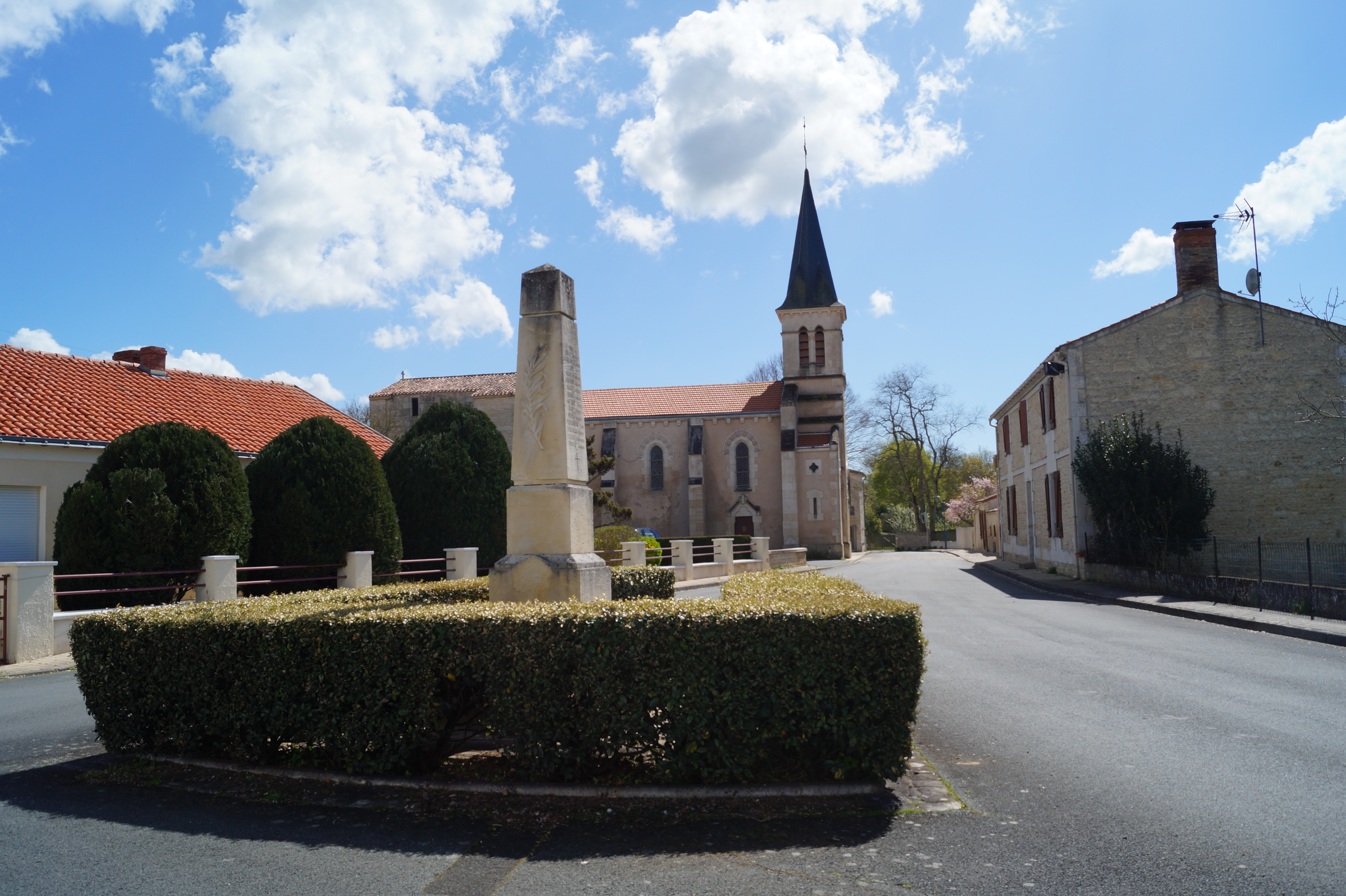
- Location of Chasnais
- Location within France Location within Pays de la Loire
- Coordinates: 46°27′38″N 1°13′42″W
- Country: France
- Region: Pays de la Loire
- Department: Vendée
- Arrondissement: Fontenay-le-Comte
- Canton: Luçon

Government
  - Mayor (2020–2026): Gérard Praud
- Area^{1}: 10.77 km^{2} (4.16 sq mi)
- Highest elevation: 30 m (98 ft)
- Lowest elevation: 0 m (0 ft)
- Population (2023): 818
  - Density: 76.0/km^{2} (197/sq mi)
- Time zone: UTC+01:00 (CET)
  - Summer (DST): UTC+02:00 (CEST)
- INSEE/Postal code: 85058 /85400
- ^{1} French Land Register data, which excludes lakes, ponds, glaciers > 1 km^{2} (0.386 sq mi or 247 acres) and river estuaries.

Chasnais (French pronunciation: [ʃanɛ]) is a commune of the Vendée department in the Pays de la Loire region in western France.

== See also ==
- Communes of the Vendée department
