= International Council of Universities of Saint Thomas Aquinas =

International network of universities

International Council of Universities in the Spirit of Saint Thomas Aquinas
- Abbreviation: ICUSTA
- Formation: 1993
- Type: INGO
- Legal status: Association
- Purpose: Educational, humanitarian and religious
- Headquarters: University of Saint Thomas
- Location: Montrose, Houston, U.S.
- Members: 30 universities
- President: Hervé Magnouloux, President of Catholic Institute of Higher Studies – ICES
- Main organ: Assembly/conference
- Website: icusta.org

The International Council of Universities in the Spirit of Saint Thomas Aquinas (Spanish: Consejo Internacional de Universidades en el Espíritu de Santo Tomás de Aquino) is a world-wide network of universities inspired by the thought of St. Thomas Aquinas. Generally known as ICUSTA, it promotes academic exchange between students, professors and researchers. ICUSTA unites some 23 universities, with over 200,000 students on the five continents.

== Mission ==
ICUSTA has as its main mission, to unite all the Catholic universities based on the intellectual, pedagogical and methodologic principles of Thomism, the thought of Saint Thomas Aquinas, in order to create and to integrate university policies. This takes the form of increasing the interchange between students and professors, the development of joint plans between the various institutions and the sharing of information and programs.

== History ==
ICUSTA grew out of a meeting in 1993 between representatives of the University of St. Thomas (Houston) and Universidad Santo Tomás, Chile. They were soon joined by the Pontifical University of Saint Thomas Aquinas, Angelicum in Rome, and the Universidad Santo Tomás, Colombia. In 1995 in Rome, a second conference was held which was attended by 12 universities. There a permanent international organization was established with bylaws and protocols for the accomplishment of the ICUSTA mission.

In the successive conferences additional members were added. The later meetings were in Manila, in 1997; in Fredericton, New Brunswick, Canada, in 1999; in Rome, in 2001; in Mar del Plata, Argentina, in 2003; and in Barcelona, Spain, in 2005, Australian Catholic University in Melbourne, Australia (2007), and Mary Immaculate College in Limerick, Ireland (2009).

ICUSTA returned to the Pontifical and Royal University of Santo Tomás in the Philippines in 2011 to commemorate the 400th anniversary of the founding of this great university in 1611. In 2013, the conference will be held in France at the Catholic Institute of Higher Studies - ICES. In 2015, ICUSTA hold its biennial meeting for the first time in Africa at the University of St. Thomas of Mozambique for the 12th Biennial.

== Members ==
Location	University	Website
Luanda, Angola	Universidade Católica de Angola	www.ucan.edu
Mar del Plata, Argentina	Universidad Fraternidad de Agrupaciones; Santo Tomás de Aquino (FASTA)	www.ufasta.edu.ar
Tucumán, Argentina	Universidad del Norte Santo Tomás de Aquino	www.unsta.edu.ar
Buenos Aires, Argentina	Universidad Católica Argentina	www.uca.edu.ar
Sydney, Australia	Campion College Australia	www.campion.edu.au
Sydney, Fremantle, Broome, Australia	University of Notre Dame Australia	www.nd.edu.au
Sydney, Australia	Australian Catholic University	www.acu.edu.au
New Brunswick, Canada	Saint Thomas University	www.stu.ca
Santiago, Chile	Universidad Santo Tomás	www.ust.cl
Bogota, Colombia	Universidad Santo Tomás	www.usantotomas.edu.co
Santiago de los Caballeros, Dominican Republic	Pontificia Universidad Católica Madre y Maestra	www.pucmmsti.edu.do
Addis Ababa, Ethiopia	Ethiopian Catholic University of St. Thomas Aquinas	
La Roche-sur-Yon, France	Catholic Institute of Higher Studies - ICES	www.ices.fr
Tegucigalpa, Honduras	Universidad Santo Tomás	N/A
Medan, Indonesia	Universitas Katolik Santo Thomas	www.ust.ac.id
(Republic of Ireland) Limerick, Ireland	Mary Immaculate College	www.mic.ul.ie
Rome, Italy	Pontifical University of St. Thomas Aquinas (Angelicum)	www.angelicum.org
Ehime, Japan	Sei Katarina Daigaku	www.catherine.ac.jp
Osaka, Japan	Sei Tomasu Daigaku	www.st.thomas.ac.jp
Maputo, Mozambique	Universidade São Tomás de Moçambique	www.ustm.ac.mz
Imo State, Nigeria	Catholic University of Nigeria	N/A
Lima, Peru	Pontificia Universidad Católica del Perú	www.pucp.edu.pe
Legazpi City, Philippines	University of Santo Tomás - Legazpi	www.aq.edu.ph
Manila, Philippines	Pontifical and Royal University of Santo Tomás	www.ust.edu.ph
Madrid, Spain	Universidad CEU San Pablo	www.ceu.es
Barcelona, Spain	Abat Oliba CEU University	www.uao.es
Valencia, Spain	Universidad CEU Cardenal Herrera	www.uch.ceu.es
Lugano, Switzerland	Facultà di Teología di Lugano	www.teologialugano.ch
(United States) California, USA	Thomas Aquinas College	www.thomasaquinas.edu
(United States) Ohio, USA	Ohio Dominican University	www.ohiodominican.edu
(United States) Texas, USA	University of Saint Thomas	www.stthom.edu
(United States) Minnesota, USA	University of Saint Thomas	www.stthomas.edu

== See also ==
- List of institutions named after Thomas Aquinas
