= La Taillée =

- Commune
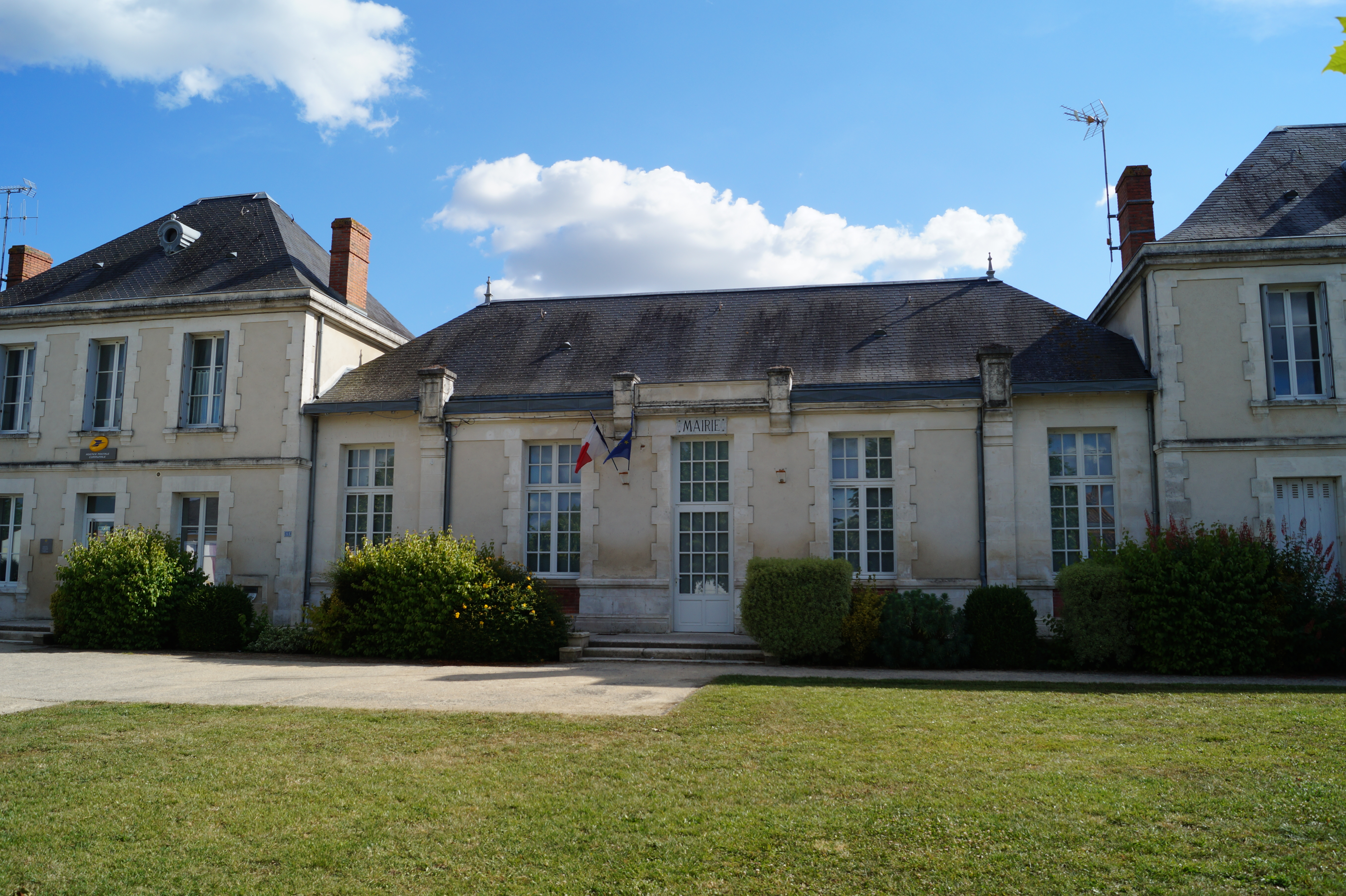
- Town hall of La Taillée
- Location of La Taillée
- Location within France Location within Pays de la Loire
- Coordinates: 46°22′49″N 0°55′38″W
- Country: France
- Region: Pays de la Loire
- Department: Vendée
- Arrondissement: Fontenay-le-Comte
- Canton: Luçon

Government
  - Mayor (2020–2026): Judicaël Lamy
- Area^{1}: 11.57 km^{2} (4.47 sq mi)
- Highest elevation: 7 m (23 ft)
- Lowest elevation: 0 m (0 ft)
- Population (2023): 550
  - Density: 48/km^{2} (120/sq mi)
- Time zone: UTC+01:00 (CET)
  - Summer (DST): UTC+02:00 (CEST)
- INSEE/Postal code: 85286 /85450
- ^{1} French Land Register data, which excludes lakes, ponds, glaciers > 1 km^{2} (0.386 sq mi or 247 acres) and river estuaries.

La Taillée (French pronunciation: [la taje]) is a commune in the Vendée department in the Pays de la Loire region in western France.

== See also ==
- Communes of the Vendée department
