= François Garnier =

French Roman Catholic archbishop (1944–2018)

François Charles Garnier
- Archbishop of Cambrai
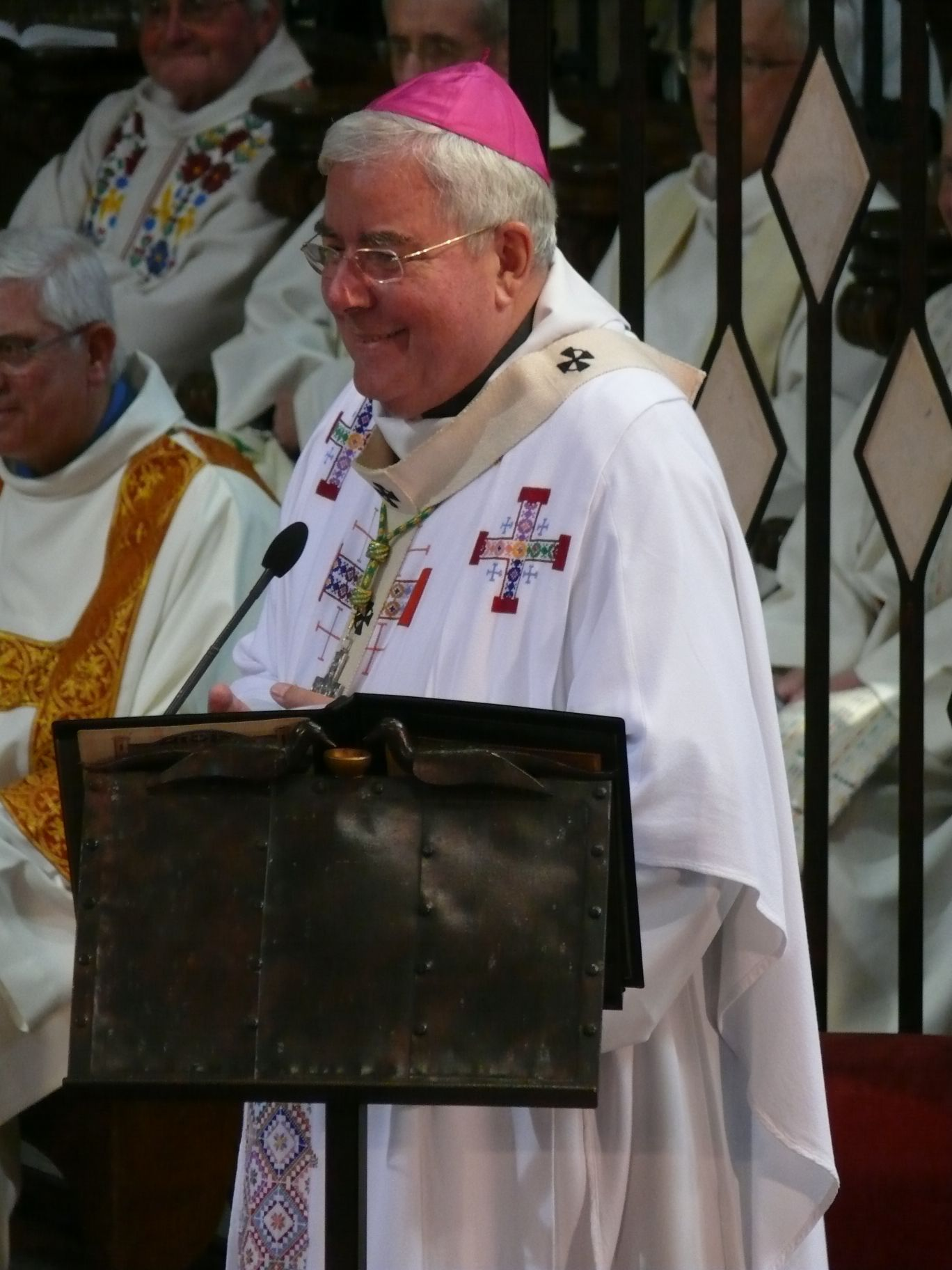
- Church: Catholic Church
- Archdiocese: Archdiocese of Cambrai
- In office: 7 December 2000 – 15 August 2018
- Predecessor: Jacques Delaporte
- Successor: Vincent Dollmann
- Previous posts: Bishop of Luçon (1991-2000); Coadjutor Bishop of Luçon (1990-1991)

Orders
- Ordination: 28 June 1970 by André Charles de la Brousse
- Consecration: 21 October 1990 by Albert Decourtray

Personal details
- Born: 7 April 1944 Beaune, Military Administration in France, Nazi Germany
- Died: 15 August 2018 (aged 74) Beaune, Bourgogne-Franche-Comté, France

François Charles Garnier (7 April 1944 – 15 August 2018) was a French Roman Catholic archbishop.

Garnier was born in Beaune, France and was ordained to the priesthood in 1970. He served as coadjutor bishop of the Roman Catholic Diocese of Luçon, France from 1990 to 1991. He then served as the bishop of the diocese from 1991 to 2000. He then served as archbishop of the Roman Catholic Archdiocese of Cambrai, France, from 2000 until his death from leukemia. He received the Legion of Honour in 2003.
