= Epiry =

- Commune
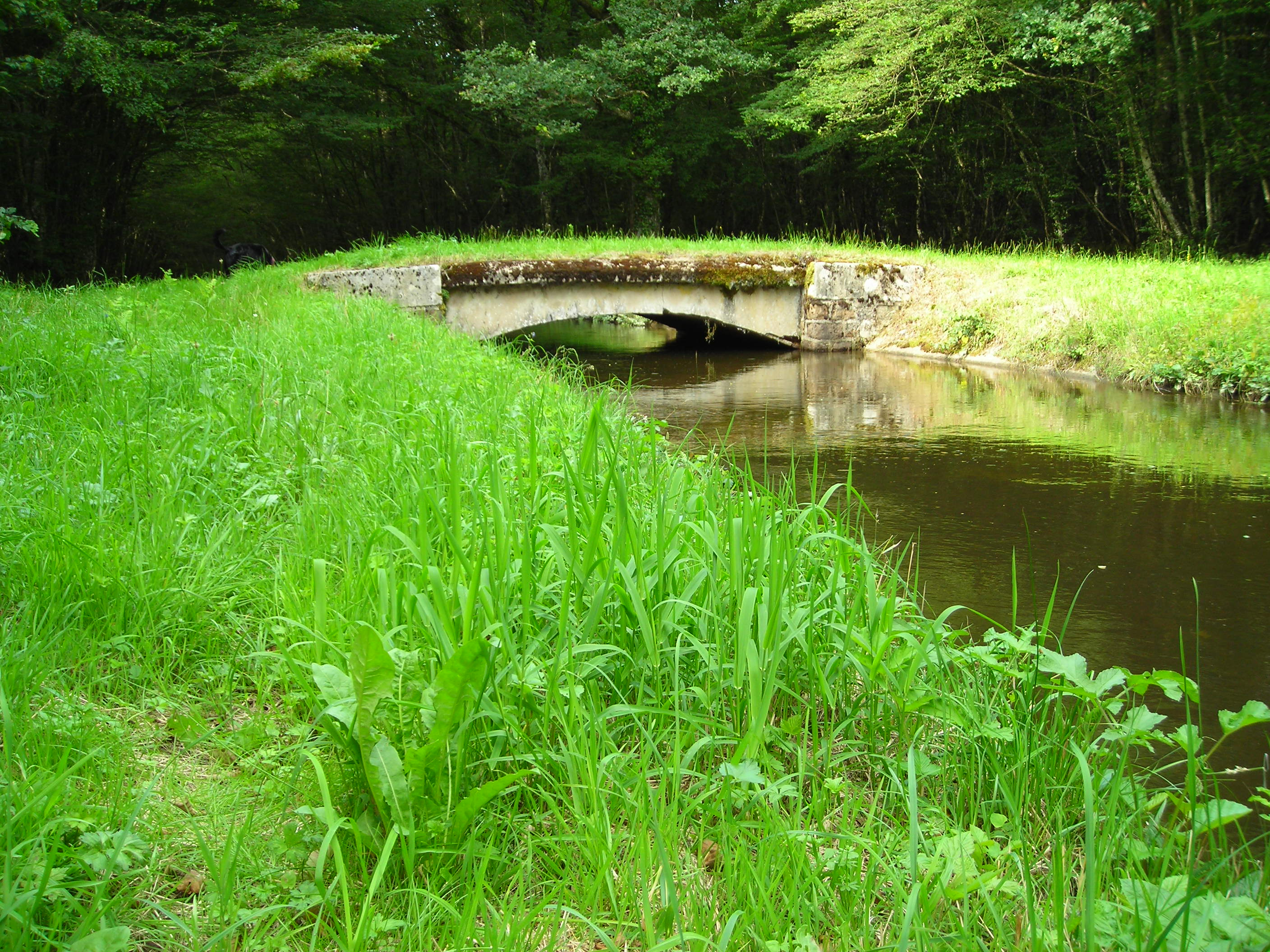
- Stone bridge over the Yonne tributary
- Location of Epiry
- Location within France Location within Bourgogne-Franche-Comté
- Coordinates: 47°11′01″N 3°43′24″E
- Country: France
- Region: Bourgogne-Franche-Comté
- Department: Nièvre
- Arrondissement: Clamecy
- Canton: Corbigny

Government
  - Mayor (2020–2026): Marie-Thérèse Thomas
- Area^{1}: 12.13 km^{2} (4.68 sq mi)
- Highest elevation: 397 m (1,302 ft)
- Lowest elevation: 217 m (712 ft)
- Population (2023): 225
  - Density: 18.5/km^{2} (48.0/sq mi)
- Time zone: UTC+01:00 (CET)
  - Summer (DST): UTC+02:00 (CEST)
- INSEE/Postal code: 58110 /58800
- ^{1} French Land Register data, which excludes lakes, ponds, glaciers > 1 km^{2} (0.386 sq mi or 247 acres) and river estuaries.

Epiry (French pronunciation: [epiʁi]) is a commune in the Nièvre department in central France.

== Demographics ==
In January 2020, the estimated population was 239.

== See also ==
- Communes of the Nièvre department
