= François Jacolin =

French Roman Catholic Prelate

The Most Reverend François Jacolin
- Bishop of Luçon
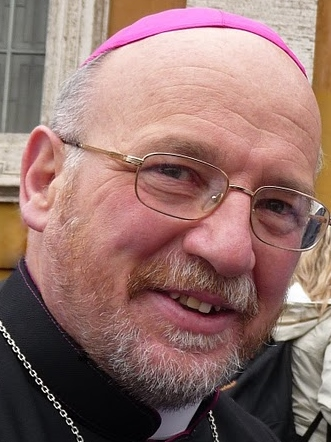
- Church: Roman Catholic Church
- Diocese: Diocese of Luçon
- Appointed: 29 May 2018
- Predecessor: Alain Castet
- Other post: Apostolic Administrator of La Rochelle (2023–)
- Previous post: Bishop of Mende (2007–2018)

Orders
- Ordination: 4 April 1982
- Consecration: 18 March 2007 by Guy Marie Alexandre Thomazeau

Personal details
- Born: Fontainebleau, France; 25 April 1950 (age 76)

François Jacolin (born 25 April 1950) is a French prelate of the Catholic Church who has served as the bishop of Luçon since 2018. He was bishop of Mende from 2007 to 2018.

== Biography ==
François Jacolin was born in Fontainebleau, France, on 25 April 1950. He studied at the minor seminary in Neuvy-sur-Barangeon and then earned a teaching license in classical literature and taught for five years in Bourges. In 1977 he entered the French seminary in Rome and took theology courses at the Pontifical Gregorian University, earning his licentiate in theology with a specialty in biblical theology.

On 4 April 1982, Jacolin was ordained a priest of the Diocese of Bourges. On 4 August 1985 he took vows as a member of the Institut religieux des Missionnaires de la Plaine et de Sainte-Thérèse in the Diocese of Luçon and he took his perpetual vows of that order on 30 September 1987.

From 1984 to 1991 he was a member of the Missionnaires team in Saint-Gaultier; in 1985 he was responsible for promoting spiritual life at the Léon XIII-Sainte-Solange Lyceum in Châteauroux; in 1989 he joined the diocesan catechesis service. From 1991 to 2004 he was a member of the priests team in Argenton-sur-Creuse; in 1992 he was parish priest and from 2001 pastor of the parish of Argenton-sur-Creuse and two other parishes; he was also diocesan superior of the Missionnaires for the Archdiocese of Bourges. From 1997 to 2003, he was episcopal delegate for the Charismatic Renewal movement. In 2003 he became episcopal vicar and delegate for religious life, and in 2004 he took on additional responsibility as pastor of the parish of the Resurrection at Châteauroux.

On 16 January 2007, Pope Benedict XVI named Jacolin bishop of Mende. He received his episcopal consecration from Archbishop Guy Marie Alexandre Thomazeau on 18 March 2007. His membership in the Missionaires ended when he became a bishop.

On 29 May 2018, Pope Francis appointed him bishop of Luçon.

On 22 June 2023, Pope Francis gave him additional responsibility as the apostolic administrator of the Diocese of La Rochelle, where Bishop Georges Colomb surrendered his responsibilities as he faced a charge of attempted rape of an adult male ten years earlier.
