= Diocese of Luçon =

Catholic diocese in France

Coordinates: 46°27′15″N 1°10′07″W

Diocese of Luçon Dioecesis Lucionensis Diocèse de Luçon

Catholic
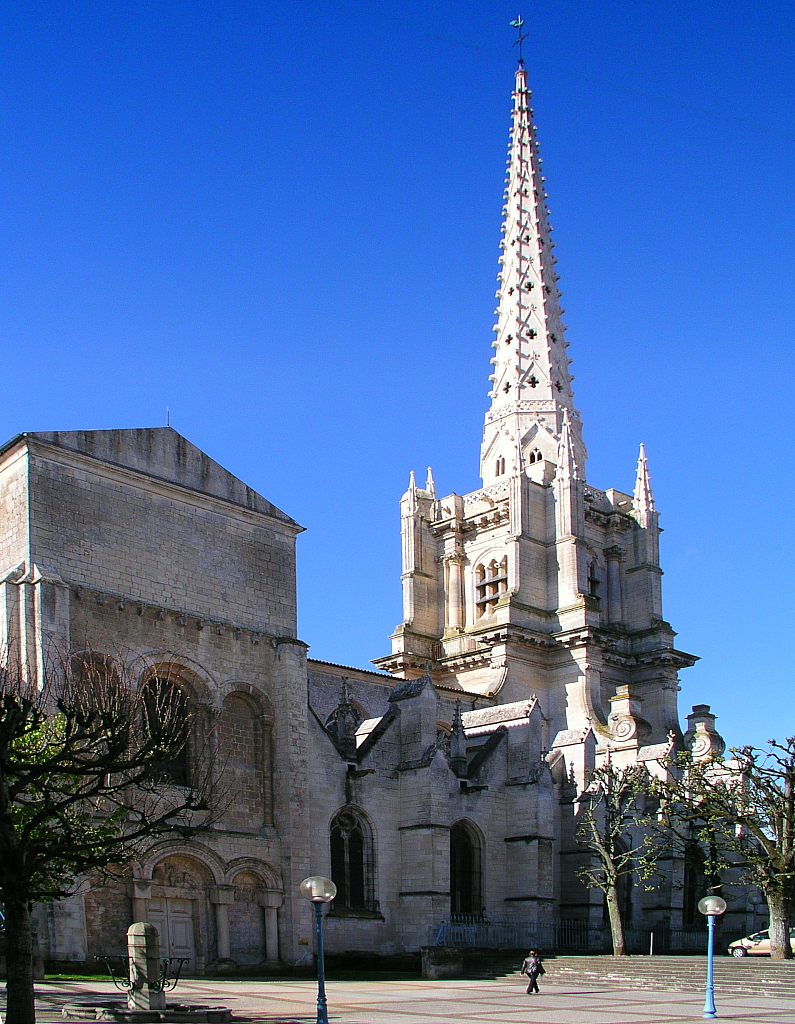
- Luçon Cathedral

- Coat of arms

Location
- Country: France
- Ecclesiastical province: Rennes
- Metropolitan: Archdiocese of Rennes, Dol, and Saint-Malo
- Headquarters: Luçon, Pays de la Loire, France

Statistics
- Area: 7,016 km^{2} (2,709 sq mi)
- Population: Total; Catholics: (as of 2023); 692,705; 542,605 (78.3%)
- Parishes: 59

Information
- Denomination: Catholic Church
- Sui iuris church: Latin Church
- Rite: Roman Rite
- Established: 16 August 1317; 709 years ago
- Cathedral: Cathedral of Notre Dame in Luçon
- Patron saint: Assumption of Mary
- Secular priests: 168 (Diocesan); 62 (Religious Orders); 56 Permanent Deacons

Current leadership
- Pope: Leo XIV
- Bishop: Renauld de Dinechin
- Metropolitan Archbishop: Pierre d'Ornellas, I.N.D.V.
- Bishops emeritus: Alain Castet; François Jacolin, M.D.P.

Map

Website
- Website of the Diocese

The Diocese of Luçon (Latin: Dioecesis Lucionensis; French: Diocèse de Luçon) is a Latin Church diocese of the Catholic Church in France. Its seat is the cathedral of Nôtre-Dame in the commune of Luçon. The diocese comprises the department of Vendée. Created in 1317 out of the diocese of Poitiers, its existence was interrupted during the French Revolution, but it was restored in 1821, following the Bourbon restoration and a new concordat with the Holy See.

Since 2002, the diocese has been a suffragan of the Archdiocese of Rennes, after transferral from the Archdiocese of Bordeaux. From September 2025, the bishop of Luçon is Renauld de Dinechin.

In 2021, in the Diocese of Luçon there was one priest for every 2,082 Catholics.

== History ==
The monastery of Luçon was founded in 682 by Ansoald, Bishop of Poitiers, who placed it under the government of St. Philibert (616–684). The monk, having been expelled from Jumièges, established the monastery of the Black Benedictines on the Isle of Her (Noirmoutiers) around 674, of which Luçon was at first a dependency, probably as a priory. The monastery of Luçon was burned to the ground by the Northmen in May 853, and was still in ruins in 877. The list of the abbots of Notre Dame de Luçon begins about the middle of the eleventh century.

In 1317, Pope John XXII engaged in a major restructuring of the episcopal organization of southern and western France, both in territory governed by the King of France and territory governed by the King of England. On 13 August 1317, in the Bull Sane Considerantes, he divided the diocese of Poitiers, creating the new dioceses of Luçon and Maillezais. His stated reason was the large size of the diocese of Poitiers and its large population, which made it difficult for only one bishop to provide all the spiritual services needed. The Abbot of Luçon, Pierre de La Veyrie (Vereya), was named the first bishop of Luçon. He was consecrated in Avignon on 20 November 1317 by Cardinal Berengarius Fredoli, Bishop of Porto.

During the administration of Bishop Elias Martineau (1421–1424), trouble came to the diocese of Luçon in the person of Georges de la Trémoille (1385–1446), the future favorite of King Charles VII. Tremoille owned a fief in the neighborhood, the barony of Mareuil-sur-le-Lay, which, in his own mind, gave him preeminence among all the seigneurs in the area. The Bishop of Luçon owned the fortress in the town of Luçon, which Tremoille wanted and which he took by military force, dispossessing the bishop's castellan; he did the same at Moutiers-sur-le-Lay, also a property of the bishops of Luçon. He then began to levy taxes on the vassals of Luçon. He continued to hold these properties illegally and by force into the reign of the next bishop, Guillaume de Goyon, who finally appealed directly to the King, who on 16 November 1424 ordered his seneschals to restore the Bishop to his full possession and rights. This did not stop Tremoille in his harassment. In 1436 Bishop Fleury had to apply to Parlement for an arrêt against him, which repeated the King's orders to his seneschals. Tremoille replied by building a fortress of his own on land owned by the bishop at Le Moulin du Puy-du-Fou, in which he placed a garrison led by one of his bastard sons.

After the death of Tremoille in 1446, Bishop Nicolas Coeur (1442–1451) was able to obtain from the King the grant of the right to hold two fairs at Moutiers-sur-le-Lay, one for the Monday after Ascension day (April or early May) and the other on the Tuesday after All Saints Day (November 1). This brought increased economic activity to the area, and profits for the bishop.

It was Bishop Milon d'Illiers (1527–1552) who purchased the barony of Luçon from Anne de Laval. The barony was held from the Count of Poitou, who was the King of France. The bishops thus became Seigneurs de Luçon, and a direct vassal of the King.

In 1516 King Francis I signed a treaty with Pope Leo X, which has come to be called the Concordat of Bologna, in which the King and his successors acquired the right to nominate each and every one of the bishops in France, except those of the dioceses of Metz, Toul and Verdun. This of course interfered with the traditional rights of the cathedral Chapters to elect their bishop, and from time to time Chapters would attempt to conduct a free election despite the king's nomination. When the king was an heretic or excommunicate, the problems were especially serious.

=== Cathedral and Chapter ===
On the same day he ordered that the churches of the Benedictine monasteries in the towns of Luçon and Maillezais should become the cathedrals of the new dioceses, in perpetuam. In Luçon the church was dedicated to the Virgin Mary, and the monks of the monastery provided the clergy of the Chapter of the cathedral, down to 1468.

In 1468 the Chapter of the cathedral was "secularized', by a bull of Pope Paul II; that is, the monks no longer provided the officials and members of the Chapter, but instead the Chapter was reorganized as a college of secular canons. The Pope also provided the college of canons with a set of statutes. The dignities (not dignitaries) of the Chapter were: the Dean, the Archdeacon-Major, the Archdeacon of Aziana, the Archdeacon of Alperia, the Cantor, the Provost, the Treasurer, the Chancellor, the Subdeacon and the Succentor. There were thirty full prebends and seven semi-prebends. In 1672 there were twelve dignities and thirty Canons.

On 30 December 1637, by letters patent, King Louis XIII granted the members of the Chapter of Luçon exemption from the obligation to quarter troops of the king in times of emergency and to have their property and goods seized.

All Cathedral Chapters were dissolved by order of the National Constituent Assembly in 1790, and their property and incomes directed to "the good of the people".

There was also a collegiate church in the diocese, at Montaigu, founded in 1438 (or 1356) and dedicated to Saint Maurice. It was presided over by a Dean, elected by the Canons, and confirmed by the bishop. There was also a Cantor, Subcantor, a Sacristan, and three Canons.

=== Revolution ===
The diocese of Luçon was abolished during the French Revolution by the Legislative Assembly, under the Civil Constitution of the Clergy (1790). Its territory was subsumed into the new diocese, called 'Vendée', which was part of the Metropolitanate called the 'Métropole du Sud-Ouest'. The Civil Constitution mandated that bishops be elected by the citizens of each 'département', which immediately raised the most severe canonical questions, since the electors did not need to be Catholics and the approval of the Pope was not only not required, but actually forbidden. Erection of new dioceses and transfer of bishops, moreover, was not canonically in the competence of civil authorities or of the Church in France. The result was schism between the 'Constitutional Church' and the Roman Catholic Church. The legitimate bishop of Luçon, Marie-Charles-Isidore de Mercy, refused to take the oath, and therefore the episcopal seat was declared vacant. He was in fact one of the thirty bishops who subscribed to the Exposition des principes, sur la Constitution civile du Clergé (30 October 1790).

On 27 February 1791 the electors of 'Vendée' were assembled at Fontenay. Of the 478 electors, only 173 appeared. Next day 77 of them elected Jean-Sylvain Servant, the Vicar General of Angers. He immediately received a letter from Bishop de Mercy, and on 30 March he resigned. A second election was held, with only 99 electors present, and on 1 May the Oratorian priest François Auguste Rodrigue, the prior-curé of Fougère, was elected. He was consecrated at Notre-Dame de Paris on 29 May 1791 by Constitutional Bishop Jean-Baptiste Gobel. He resigned in 1793, in time to avoid the anti-revolutionary rising of the Vendée and the retaliation of the Terror, and obtained a post in the civil administration. He had no successor in the Constitutional church.

During the Vendée, three engagements took place at or near Luçon, the final battle taking place on 14 August 1793. In each, the troops of the Republic were successful.

Once the Concordat of 1801 with First Consul N. Bonaparte went into effect, Pius VII was able to issue the appropriate bulls to restore many of the dioceses and to regulate their boundaries, most of which corresponded closely to the new 'départements'. The Bull Qui Christi Domini abolished all the dioceses of France, and recreated most of the dioceses of the Ancien Régime. The diocese of Luçon was not one of them. The diocese of Luçon was suppressed by the Concordat of 1801 and annexed to the Diocese of La Rochelle; its bishop, from 1804 to 1821 was Gabriel-Laurent Pailloux.

=== Revival ===
The diocese of Luçon was reestablished in principle in the Concordat of 11 June 1817, but difficulties between the King, his Legislative Assembly (which refused to ratify the Concordat), and the Pope, postponed the implementation until 1821. The Diocese of Luçon thereafter comprised the territory of the ancient diocese (minus a few parishes incorporated in the Diocese of Nantes); and almost all the former Diocese of Maillezais, which was permanently suppressed.

In 1856 the diocese of Luçon became involved in an international scandal. The bishop of Luçon, Jacques-Marie-Joseph Baillès, had been appointed in 1845 by the government of King Louis-Philippe. The bishop was a firm royalist, as well as an ultramontanist, and an active enforcer of the decrees of the Council of Trent. In 1848 the Minister of Public Instruction, M. Marie-Louis Pierre Felix Esquirou de Parieu, had appointed to a teaching position in the collège in Luçon a Jewish professor. Bishop Baillès protested loudly against anyone who at any time could entrust the education of young Christians to an Israelite. In 1852 he had published a pastoral letter supporting the Index of Prohibited Books, which was a challenge to the opinions of, among others, Senator Gustave Rouland, the incoming Minister of Public Instruction and Cults. The French government demanded the removal of Bishop Baillès by the Pope, and Pius IX, who was maintained on his throne in Rome only with the support of French troops, had no alternative but to do as requested, and he demanded the resignation of the bishop. Baillès resigned on 21 February 1856, and made his way to Rome; his successor was nominated by the government on 5 March. On 11 March 1856, in his capacity as a Senator, Rouland gave a speech in favor of Gallicanism and against the Index, emphasizing the policies of which Baillès was such a vocal critic. The bishop was offered a titular archbishopric by the Pope, but he preferred to call himself ancien évêque de Luçon. He was appointed to the Congregation of the Index in the Roman Curia, and in 1866 continued his feud by publishing a book in defense of the Congregation of the Index. He died in exile on 17 November 1873.

== Bishops ==
=== 1317 to 1500 ===
- 1317–1334: Petrus (or Pierre) I. de La Veyrie
- 1334–1353: Renaud de Thouars
- 1354: Jean Jofevri
- 1354: Gualterus
- 1354–1359: Guy (Guido)
- 1359–1387: Guillaume de La Rochefoucauld
- 1388–1407: Etienne Loypelli
- 1407–1408: Martin Goyon
- 1408–1418: Germain Paillard
- 1421–1424: Elias Martineau (Martinelli)
- 1424–1431: Guillaume de Goyon
- 1431–1441: Jean Fleury, O.Cist.
- 1442–1451: Nicolas Coeur
- 1451–1461: André de La Roche
- 1461–1490: Nicolas Boutault
- 1491–1494: Mathurin de Dercé
- 1496–1514: Pierre de Sacierges

=== from 1500 to 1800 ===
- 1515–1523: Ladislaus Dufau
- 1523–1524: Jean de Lorraine-Guise
- 1524–1527: Cardinal Louis de Bourbon
- 1527–1552: Milon d'Illiers
- 1553–1562: René de Daillon du Lude
- 1562–1573: Jean-Baptiste Tiercelin
- 1578–1584: René de Salla
- 1586–1592: Jacques Duplessis-Richelieu

[1595–1600: François Yver ]
[ Alphonse-Louis du Plessis de Richelieu ]

- 1606–1623: Armand-Jean du Plessis de Richelieu
- 1624–1635: Aimeric de Bragelone
- 1637–1660: Pierre Nivelle, O.Cist.
- 1661–1671 Nicolas Colbert
- 1672–1699: Henri de Barillon
- 1699–1723: Jean-François de Valderies de Lescure
- 1723–1736: Michel-Roger de Bussin–Rabutin
- 1738–1758: Samuel-Guillaume de Verthamon de Chavagnac
- 1759–1775: Claude-Jacquemet Gautier
- 1775–1801: Marie-Charles-Isidore de Mercy, (17 Nov 1775 – 24 Oct 1801)

=== since 1800 ===
- (1821–1845) : René-François Soyer
- (1845–1856) : Jacques-Marie-Joseph Baillès
- (1856–1861) : François-Augustin Delamare
- (1861–1874) : Charles-Théodore Colet
- (1875–1877) : Jules François Lecoq
- (1877–1915) : Clovis-Nicolas-Joseph Catteau
- (1916–1940) : Gustave-Lazare Garnier
- (1941–1967) : Antoine-Marie Cazaux
- (1967–1991) : Charles-Auguste-Marie Paty
- (1991–2000) : François Charles Garnier
- (2001–2007) : Michel Santier
- (2008–2017) : Alain Castet
- (2018–2025) : François Joseph Marie Jacolin, M.D.P.
- (2025–Present) : Renauld de Dinechin

== See also ==
- Catholic Church in France

== Bibliography ==
=== Reference books ===
- Eubel, Conradus, ed. (1913). Hierarchia catholica, Tomus 1 (second ed.). Münster: Libreria Regensbergiana. p. 315. (in Latin)
- Eubel, Conradus, ed. (1914). Hierarchia catholica, Tomus 2 (second ed.). Münster: Libreria Regensbergiana. pp. 181–182.
- Eubel, Conradus, ed. (1923). Hierarchia catholica, Tomus 3 (second ed.). Münster: Libreria Regensbergiana. p. 230.
- Gauchat, Patritius (Patrice) (1935). Hierarchia catholica IV (1592-1667). Münster: Libraria Regensbergiana. p. 225.
- Ritzler, Remigius; Sefrin, Pirminus (1952). Hierarchia catholica medii et recentis aevi V (1667-1730). Patavii: Messagero di S. Antonio.
- Ritzler, Remigius; Sefrin, Pirminus (1958). Hierarchia catholica medii et recentis aevi VI (1730-1799). Patavii: Messagero di S. Antonio. p. 267.
- Sainte-Marthe, Denis de (1785). Gallia christiana, in provincias ecclesiasticas distributa. Vol. Tomus decimus-tertius (13). Paris: Johannes- Baptista Coignard. pp. 226–266, Instrumenta, pp. 181–220.

=== Studies ===
- Aillery, Eugène (1860). Pouillé de l'Evêché de Luçon (in French). Fontenay-le-Comte: Imprimerie de Robuchon.
- Jean, Armand (1891). Les évêques et les archevêques de France depuis 1682 jusqu'à 1801 (in French). Paris: A. Picard. pp. 135–139.
- Lacroix, Lucien (1890). Richelieu à Luçon: sa jeunesse--son épiscopat (in French). Paris: Letouzey et Ané.
- La Fontenelle de Vaudoré, Armand-Désiré (1847). Histoire du monastère et des évêques de Luçon (in French). Vol. premiere partie. Fontenay le Comte: Gaudin.
- La Fontenelle, A. D. de (1847). Histoire du monastère et des évêques de Luçon (in French). Vol. 2 parts. Fontenay-le-Comte: Gaudin.
- Tressay, Georges du (1869). Histoire des moines et des évêques de Luçon (in French). Vol. Tome I. Paris: Lecoffre Fils.
- Tressay, Georges du (1869). Histoire des moines et des évêques de Luc̦on (in French). Vol. Tome II. Paris: Lecoffre Fils.
- Tressay, Georges du (1870). Histoire des moines et des év́eq̂ues de Luco̧n (in French). Vol. Tome III (second ed.). Paris: Lecoffre, Palmé.
- Société bibliographique (France) (1907). Georges Simon (ed.). L'épiscopat français depuis le Concordat jusqu'à la Séparation (1802-1905) (in French). Paris: Librairie des Saints-Pères. pp. 304–310.
