= Luçon =

- Commune
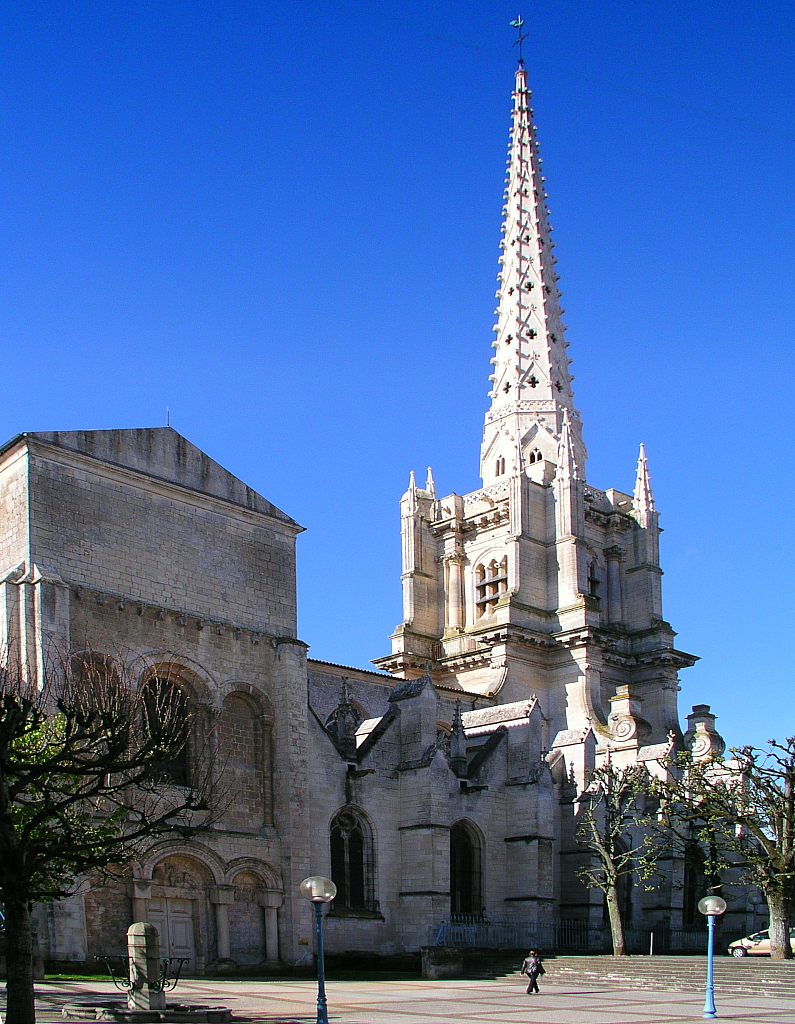
- Cathédrale Notre-Dame-de-l'Assomption de Luçon

- Coat of arms
- Location of Luçon
- Location within France Location within Pays de la Loire
- Coordinates: 46°27′20″N 1°09′53″W
- Country: France
- Region: Pays de la Loire
- Department: Vendée
- Arrondissement: Fontenay-le-Comte
- Canton: Luçon
- Intercommunality: Sud Vendée Littoral

Government
  - Mayor (2020–2026): Dominique Bonnin
- Area^{1}: 31.52 km^{2} (12.17 sq mi)
- Highest elevation: 40 m (130 ft)
- Lowest elevation: 1 m (3.3 ft)
- Population (2023): 9,417
  - Density: 298.8/km^{2} (773.8/sq mi)
- Time zone: UTC+01:00 (CET)
  - Summer (DST): UTC+02:00 (CEST)
- INSEE/Postal code: 85128 /85400
- ^{1} French Land Register data, which excludes lakes, ponds, glaciers > 1 km^{2} (0.386 sq mi or 247 acres) and river estuaries.

Luçon (pronounced [lysɔ̃]) is a commune in the Vendée department, Pays de la Loire region, western France. Its inhabitants are known as Luçonnais.

Luçon Cathedral is the seat of the Diocese of Luçon (comprising the Vendée), where Cardinal Richelieu once served as bishop.

== History ==
Once a Roman town (Lucionensis), Luçon takes its name from the Latin word for the northern pike (Lucius) and this fish decorates the coat of arms to this day. The town had an important position on the Roman road from Les Sables d'Olonne to Niort, and was a sea port in the Roman period.

During the Dark Ages, a monastery was founded here by Saint Philbert. The town was sacked by the Normans in 846 and plundered by the Vikings in 853. In the Middle Ages, the receding seas left Luçon inland, but a canal allowed it to maintain a port connected to the Atlantic. The town remained an important commercial centre throughout this period.

Luçon became the spiritual capital of Bas Poitou in 1317, when Pope John XXII located the seat of the Diocese of Luçon here. Today, the town is perhaps most famous for its association with Armand Jean du Plessis (Cardinal Richelieu). Before becoming a minister of Louis XIII, Richelieu was the bishop of Luçon. During his tenure he directed the rebuilding of much of the town after it was destroyed during the French Wars of Religion. This included restoring the magnificent Cathedral of Notre Dame, whose 85-metre spire dominates the countryside for miles. Within the cathedral can be found a church organ donated by Napoleon III, while a statue of Richelieu stands outside.

In the 18th-19th centuries, the town was refurbished in a pseudo-medieval style. Many of the most remarkable buildings, including those in the quartier Bourgneuf, were constructed at this time. The elegant town park, the Jardin Dumaine, was donated to the inhabitants by local doctor Pierre-Hyacinthe Dumaine in 1872.

== Population ==
Historical population
Year	Pop.	±% p.a.
1968	8,243	—
1975	9,002	+1.27%
1982	9,066	+0.10%
1990	9,099	+0.05%
1999	9,311	+0.26%
2007	9,722	+0.54%
2012	9,437	−0.59%
2017	9,540	+0.22%
2023	9,417	−0.22%
Source: INSEE

== See also ==
- Communes of the Vendée department
- In Luçon's mairie there is a sculpture of Richelieu by Pierre Charles Lenoir
