= Georges Colomb (bishop) =

French Catholic bishop (born 1953)

- Bishop of La Rochelle
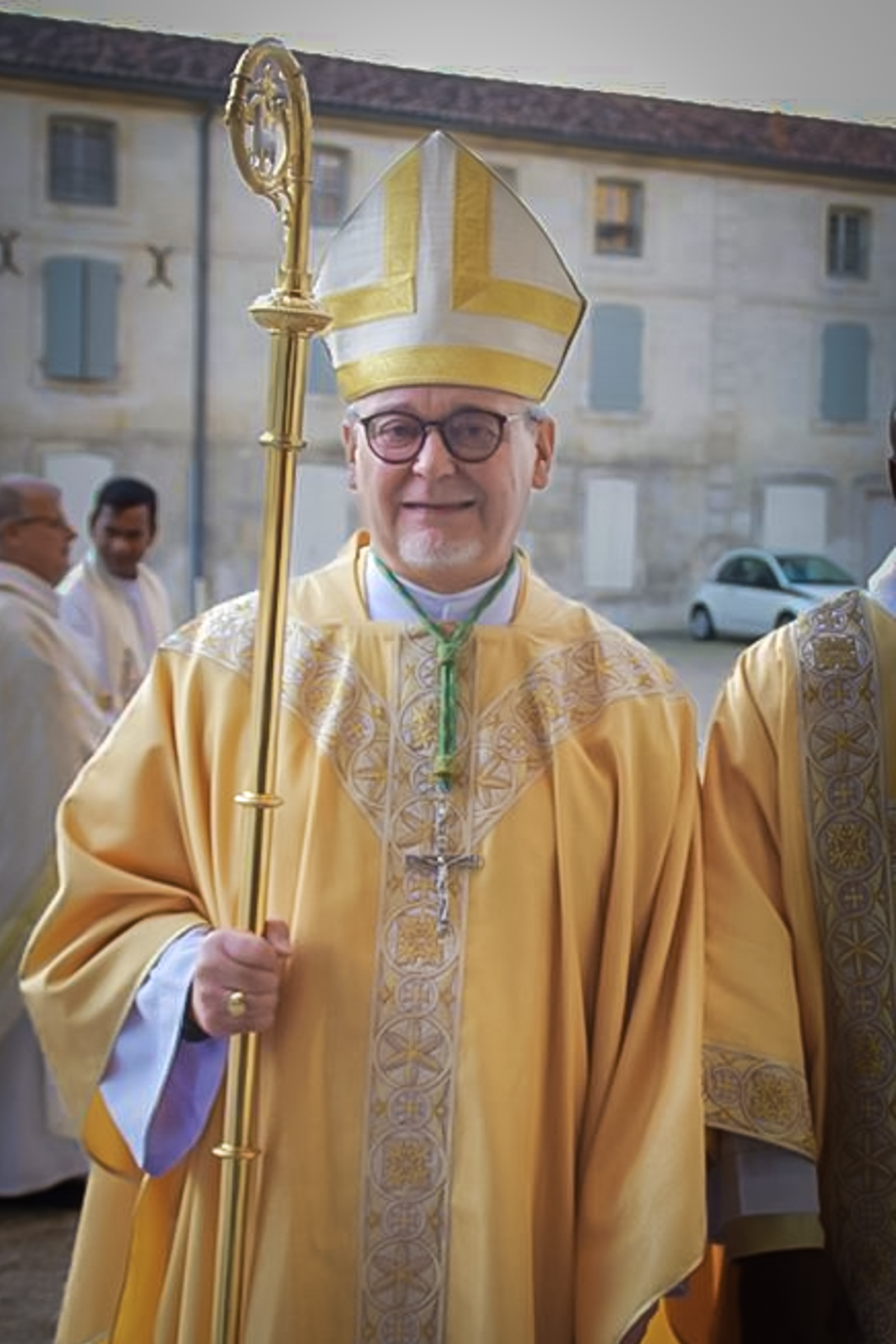
- Diocese: La Rochelle
- Appointed: 9 March 2016
- Predecessor: Bernard Housset
- Previous post: Superior General of the Paris Foreign Missions Society (2010–16)

Orders
- Ordination: 13 September 1987 by Jean Dardel
- Consecration: 5 May 2016 by André Vingt-Trois

Personal details
- Born: 15 June 1953 (age 73) Saint-Anthème, France
- Coat of arms

Georges Colomb (born 15 June 1953) is a French prelate of the Catholic Church who has been bishop of La Rochelle since 2016. Since June 2023, he has continued to hold that title though suspended from exercising his authority as a diocesan bishop as he contests a charge of attempted rape.

== Biography ==
Georges Colomb was born on 15 June 1953 in Saint-Anthème (Puy-de-Dôme). He attended schools in Clermont-Ferrand and Riom. Aiming at a business career he earned a diploma in hotel management and studied law and economic administration. He entered the civil service and worked for five years as an inspector for the Post and Telecommunications in Lyon and Nanterre. At the age of 29, moved by the ongoing Vietnamese emigration crisis, he discovered his vocation and entered the Carmelite Seminary in Paris. He graduated from the Catholic Institute of Paris with a degree in theology.

On 13 September 1987, he was ordained a priest for the Paris Foreign Missions Society (MEP), an association devoted to evangelization in non-Catholic countries, especially in Asia.

After studying English, the dominant foreign language in Asia, in London, he studied Mandarin Chinese and Asian culture in Taiwan for two years. From 1990 to 1998 he taught French and French civilization as a university professor in the People's Republic of China, identified as a "foreign expert", since Christian evangelization was prohibited. For his work the French government awarded him the Palmes Académiques in 2007.

In 1998, Colomb returned to Paris, where the MEP General Assembly elected him to serve as an assistant on the Superior General's Council, where he was responsible for vocations and seminarians and for volunteer programs that assigned young laypeople to Asian missions for stints as long as two years. In 2004 he was elected to a six-year term as the MEP's vicar general, still responsible for vocations and volunteers. He was elected to a six-year term as MEP superior general on 9 July 2010.

On 9 March 2016, Pope Francis named him bishop of La Rochelle. He received his episcopal consecration on 5 May 2016 from Cardinal André Vingt-Trois, Archbishop of Paris, at the La Rochelle exhibition center.

In March 2018, when the Apostolic Vicariate of Iles Saint Pierre and Miquelon was merged into his diocese, Colomb expressed a missionary's viewpoint: "The fact of attaching ourselves to a diocese with which we have forged links will help our Church to emerge from a certain isolation."

In April 2020, Cardinal Luis Antonio Tagle named him head of the Pontifical Mission Society for France.

In May 2023, Church officials reported a claim against Colomb for attempted rape of an adult male in 2013 to civil authorities. On 13 June, when the media reported the launch of both civil and Church investigations, Colomb announced that he had asked Pope Francis to relieve him of his responsibilities for the duration of the legal process. He canceled his other public activities, called the charges "slanderous", and threatened legal action against anyone who recklessly repeats them. His authority as bishop of La Rochelle has been exercised by another French prelate since 22 June. (Note: Pope Francis assigned his full authority to an apostolic administrator, Bishop François Jacolin of Luçon on 22 June. On 19 August 2025, anticipateing Jacolin's retirement, Pope Leo XIV appointed Bishop Pierre-Antoine Bozo of Limoges as bishop coadjutor of La Rochelle, with that same authority. Bozo's installation on 19 October.)

Prosecutors filed preliminary charges against Colomb on 17 November 2023.
