= Maillezais Cathedral =

Ruined cathedral in the Vendée, France

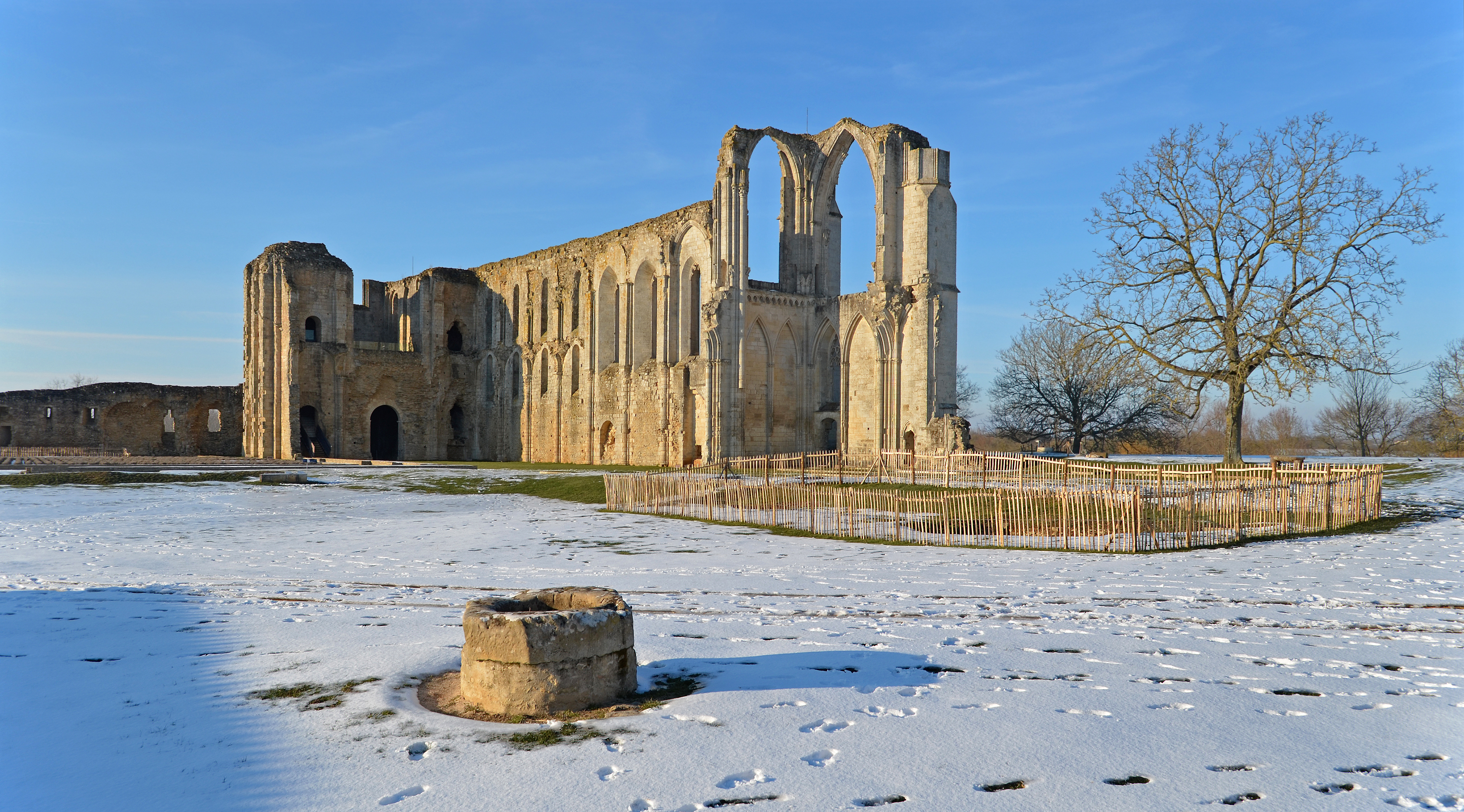
- Ruins at the site of the former Maillezais Abbey and Cathedral

- Location of Maillezais Cathedral in France

Religion
- Affiliation: Roman Catholic
- Province: Diocese of Maillezais
- Rite: Roman
- Ecclesiastical or organisational status: Non-functional
- Status: In ruins

Location
- Location: Maillezais, Pays de la Loire, France
- Coordinates: 46.3733°N 0.7475°W

Architecture
- Type: Abbey church
- Style: Gothic, Romanesque, Renaissance
- Groundbreaking: 11th century
- Completed: 15th century
- Monument historique
- Official name: Ancienne abbaye Saint-Pierre
- Designated: 30 January 1924

Maillezais Cathedral (French: Cathédrale Saint-Pierre de Maillezais, or St. Peter Maillezais) is a ruined Roman Catholic church in the commune of Maillezais in the Vendée, France. Formerly the site of the Abbey of Saint-Pierre, the site grew from the 10th century abbey to the cathedral completed in the 15th century, with the many structures at the site abandoned by the end of the 17th century. Today's ruins consist of a cathedral, refectory, dormitory, kitchen, cellars, turrets and ramparts. The cathedral has been declared a heritage monument in reflection of its Romanesque and Gothic architectural form. It was designated a monument historique on 30 January 1924. The cathedral belonged to the Diocese of Luçon, with Roman Rites, and with St. Peter as the patron saint.

== History ==
Around 1100, Abbot Pierre wrote two books on the founding and construction of the Abbey of Maillezais. The Abbot Pierre's account tells that during a hunting expedition in 976, Countess Emma, the wife of William IV, Duke of Aquitaine, discovered the ruins of a chapel dedicated to Saint Hilaire and decided to found an abbey at the site. The couple contributed to the structure's rebuilding and it became an important monastery in the Pays de la Loire. The new church was consecrated in 989 by Gombald, Archbishop of Bordeaux.

Father Gausbert, cousin of Countess Emma, brought thirteen monks from Église Saint-Julien de Tours to create a Benedictine abbey, first settling in Saint-Pierre-le-Vieux, Vendée, about 2 kilometres (1.2 mi) north of the current ruins. The abbey's jurisdiction later passed from Église Saint-Julien de Tours to Église Saint-Cyprien in Poitiers. In 1010, the Saint-Pierre-le-Vieux abbey moved to Maillezais, with groundbreaking for a new Maillezais chapel, soon after again dedicated to Saint Pierre (St. Peter).William V, Duke of Aquitaine was buried at the abbey's cloister in 1030. His sons Guillaume and Eudes chose to be buried in Maillezais as well. In May 1197, by the bull Officii nostri, Pope Clement III took the monastery of Maillezais under papal protection, listing all of its dependencies and properties.

In 1225, Geoffroy d'Estissac, who was envious of Maillezais, attacked and looted the abbey. Excommunicated from the church, he went to Rome and apologized to the Pope in the presence of the abbot of Maillezais for his wrongful deeds. After he was pardoned, he restructured it with additional bays extending the nave. Under Abbot Geoffroy II Povereau in the early 14th century, it was a large property consisting of churches, priories, and large fertile land.

The Abbey of Maillezais was located on an island in the waterlogged Marais Poitevin. The area was extensively developed in the early part of the 13th century, when the abbeys of Maillezais, Nieul-sur-l'Autise, Saint-Michel-en-Herm, and the Absie St. Maixent joined together for the project. The monks dug canals to manage the water and create more arable land.

In 1317, after the final suppression of the Albigensians in France, Pope John XXII restructured the allocation of French bishoprics, creating two new episcopal sees, each with a cathedral, out of the diocese of Poitiers. Pope John XXII raised the status of Maillezais to that of diocese, with Saint-Pierre Cathedral (formerly the abbey church) becoming the seat of the new Bishop of Maillezais. The abbot of Maillezais, Geoffroy Povereau, was appointed the first bishop. The cathedral became a center of intellectual pursuits; in the early 16th century François Rabelais taught at the abbey for five years.

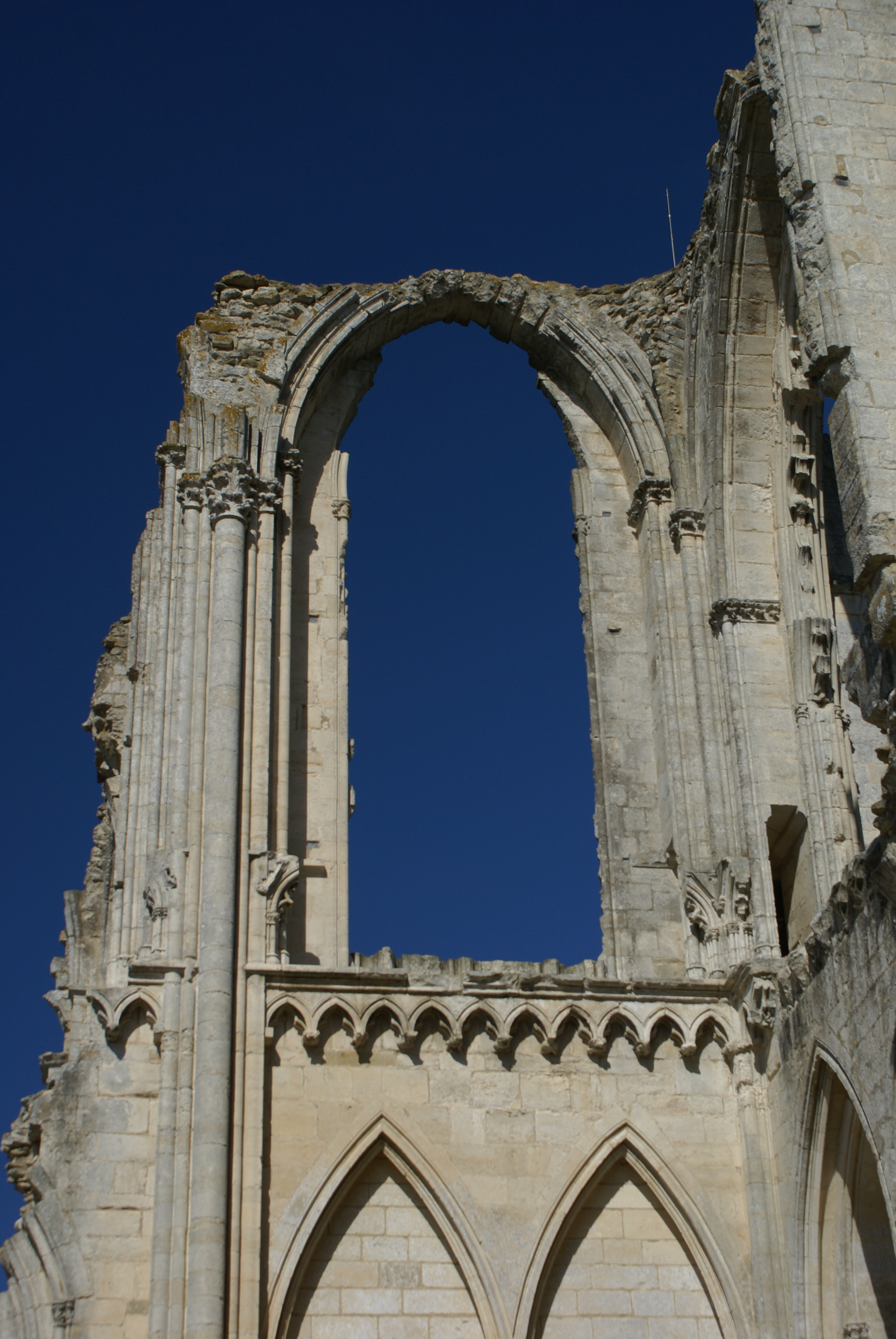
A surviving bay of the Gothic transept

The refurbishing of the cathedral was continued, and in the middle of the 14th century a Gothic transept was added and a bell was also provided. There were many improvements to the cathedral's interiors such as better furnishings, conversion of the abbot's residence into an episcopal palace, building of a monastery dormitory near the second cloister. However, what remains among the ruins of the cathedral are its eastern and southern wings.

Among other bishops of the cathedral were Guillaume de Lucé (1421–38) and Thibaud de Lucé (1438–55), who were political counselors to Charles VII. Further improvements took place when Geoffrey d'Estissac of Périgord became the bishop in 1518. It was the last refurbishing done and the additions made were the choir of the cathedral and also the castle of Coulonges on l'Autise. During the period after 1528, when Rabelais had been in charge of the monastic order from 1524–28, there was internecine war between the Catholics and the Protestants. The cathedral was destroyed in 1562 in the course of the Reformation and subsequent Wars of Religion.

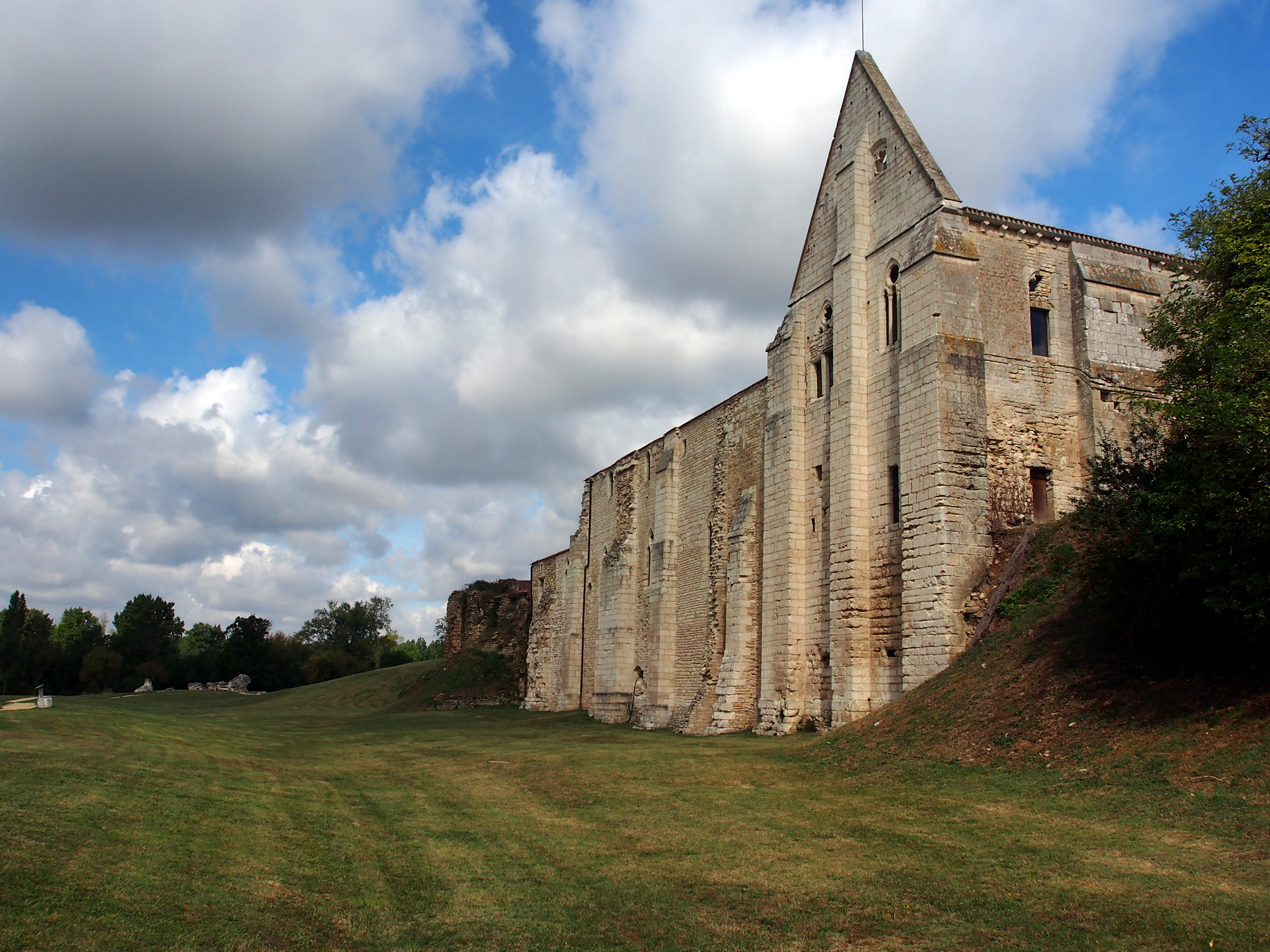
A fortresslike aspect

In 1589, Agrippa d'Aubigné, a Protestant, a scholar and a poet, became the bishop and fortified the cathedral with a watch tower. The fort became a stronghold of the Protestants for the next thirty years till the Duke of Rohan succeeded him.

When during the late 16th and early 17th century the Protestants of the Huguenots had converted it into a fort-like structure, the Catholics had to even baptize their children outside the city limits. It remained under the control of the Protestants till 1618. But by 1619 the cathedral was back under the control of the Catholics and Henri de Sourdis became the Bishop. In 1629, the Bishopric of Maillezais was one of the richest in France with a lease value of 35,000 livres. It remained the seat of the Bishopric of Maillezais until 1648, when Pope Innocent X transferred the bishopric to the St. Louis Cathedral of La Rochelle, in the Diocese of La Rochelle. The monastic community continued at the Maillezais site until 1666, when the entire site was abandoned.

The cathedral site remained dormant till after the French Revolution when it was sold as national property to serve as a stone quarry. In 1840, it was returned to the people, who decided to maintain the cathedral as a heritage monument. It was designated a historical monument on 30 January 1924. It was only after 1996 that the General Council of the Vendée took interest in its restoration.

== Architectural and archaeological remains ==
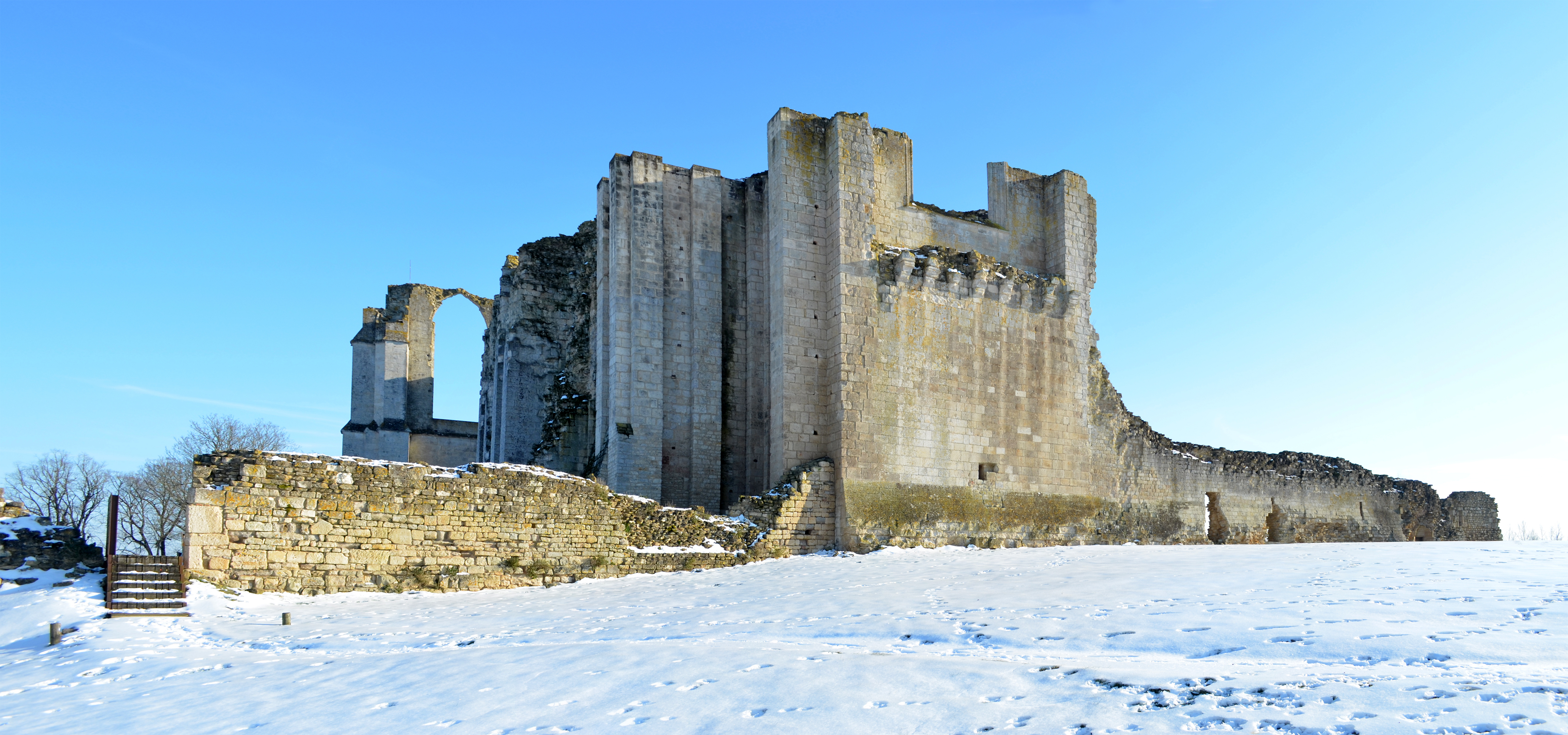
View of the ruins of Maillezais Cathedral

The façade on the west gable of the church built in 1025, which consisted of two bays of naves flanked by two towers, is now fully open. The staircase to access the first floor, which existed originally, is also missing. The fortifications in the form of battlements built in the 15th century by Agrippa are still seen. Of the seven bays added with partial columns with capitals camouflaged by the fortifications, only the top four Romanesque bays are visible. A realignment is seen in this on account of the second floor raised in later years. Three large Gothic windows topped with dissimilar arcades provide light to the naves.

Out of the high transepts, built in first half of the fourteenth century, only the north transept part is visible now. At the lower part of the walls of the transept decorated arches are seen, and in some part it is a door which provides views of the warheads. A decorated, arched cornice is seen at the second level and it has two large openings in the Gothic style.

The bell tower has fully survived and from the top of the tower vistas of the marsh that surrounds the cathedral could be seen. Entrance to the tower is through a door decorated with carvings. The view from the tower also covers the northwest wall of the ruins. The façade on the northern side wall has five protective boxes, which were erected in the twelfth century.

Archaeological excavations done at the cloister and near the refectory have revealed foundations of buildings—a kitchen, refectory, dormitory, and a chapter house, all built around a central garden. The kitchen had an octagonal layout. Tombs, pots, urns, remnants of columns, two capitals, butt of abbot copper enamels (dated to late thirteenth century), silos, washbasins, cellar (of 12th century) were also found. The fourteenth-century buildings such as the inn do not exist now.

Excavation done in the south wing has revealed a salt cellar at the entrance which is a large vaulted room in the basement which was used by monks for making salt. At the ground floor level there are two rooms used for dining, with the kitchen located in the basement which had a central fireplace. On the upper floor there was a second dining room as part of the dormitory, with wooden fittings and a fireplace at the centre. A pier provided the approach to the moors which could be used for plying boats through its winding channels from where one can get views of the "imposing ruins of the abbey silhouetted in the sky".

== Burials ==
- William V, Duke of Aquitaine
- William VI, Duke of Aquitaine
- Odo of Gascony

== Bibliography ==
- Bergin, Joseph (1996). The Making of the French Episcopate, 1589–1661. Yale University Press. p. 93. ISBN 978-0-300-06751-4.
- Luria, Keith P. (1 August 2005). Sacred Boundaries: Religious Coexistence and Conflict in Early-Modern France. CUA Press. ISBN 978-0-8132-1411-5.
