= Joseph Merklin =

German and French organ builder (1819–1905)

- Born: February 17, 1819; Oberhausen, Baden
- Died: July 10, 1905 (aged 86); Nancy, France
- Occupation: Organ builder

Joseph Merklin (17 February 1819 – 10 July 1905) was a Baden-born organ builder who later became a French citizen. By the time of his retirement in 1898, he was a Chevalier of the Légion d'Honneur and had built, restored, or repaired over 400 organs, primarily in the churches of Belgium and France.

== Life and career ==
Merklin was born in Oberhausen in Baden and was trained in his craft first by his father and then by Friedrich Hasse in Bern and Eberhard Friedrich Walcker in Ludwigsburg. He set up his own firm in Belgium in 1843 and later went into partnership with his brother-in-law, Friedrich Schütze, renaming the firm Merklin, Schütze & Cie. In 1855 he bought out the Ducroquet firm in Paris and began to work almost exclusively in France. Three years later, he reorganized the company as the Société Anonyme pour la Fabrication des Orgues, Établissement Merklin-Schütze. In 1867 the company's grand organ built for the Basilica of St. Epvre in Nancy received a Gold Medal at the Exposition Universelle in Paris and Merklin was made a Chevalier of the Légion d'Honneur.

Merklin had to leave France at the outbreak of the Franco-Prussian War. After the war ended, he became a naturalized French citizen and in 1872 set up a new branch in Lyon. In 1879, he gave half the shares in the Lyon company to Charles Michel, who had married Merklin's daughter Marie-Alexandrine in 1875. After internal tensions in the company, Merklin turned it over completely to his son-in-law in 1894, who continued to operate it under the name Michel-Merklin, despite Merklin's wishes. Merklin's last firm was in Paris, established with Philippe Decock and Joseph Gutschenritter.

Merklin retired in 1898 and died in Nancy at the age of 86. In his lifetime he had built, restored, or repaired over 400 organs. Many of the organs he built in France are now classified as historical monuments by the French Ministry of Culture. His grandson, Charles-Marie Michel was a promising organist and student of Louis Vierne, but died in 1897 at the age of 20. His nephew, Albert Merklin (1892 – 1925), became an organ builder. He remained in Spain at the outbreak of World War I, where he was installing a small organ built in France. Then, he worked for Eleizgaray y Cía., an organ building firm in The Basque Country. Eventually, he stablished his own workshop in Madrid and wrote a treatise in Spanish on the history and construction of the organ that was published in 1924.

== Venues with Merklin organs ==
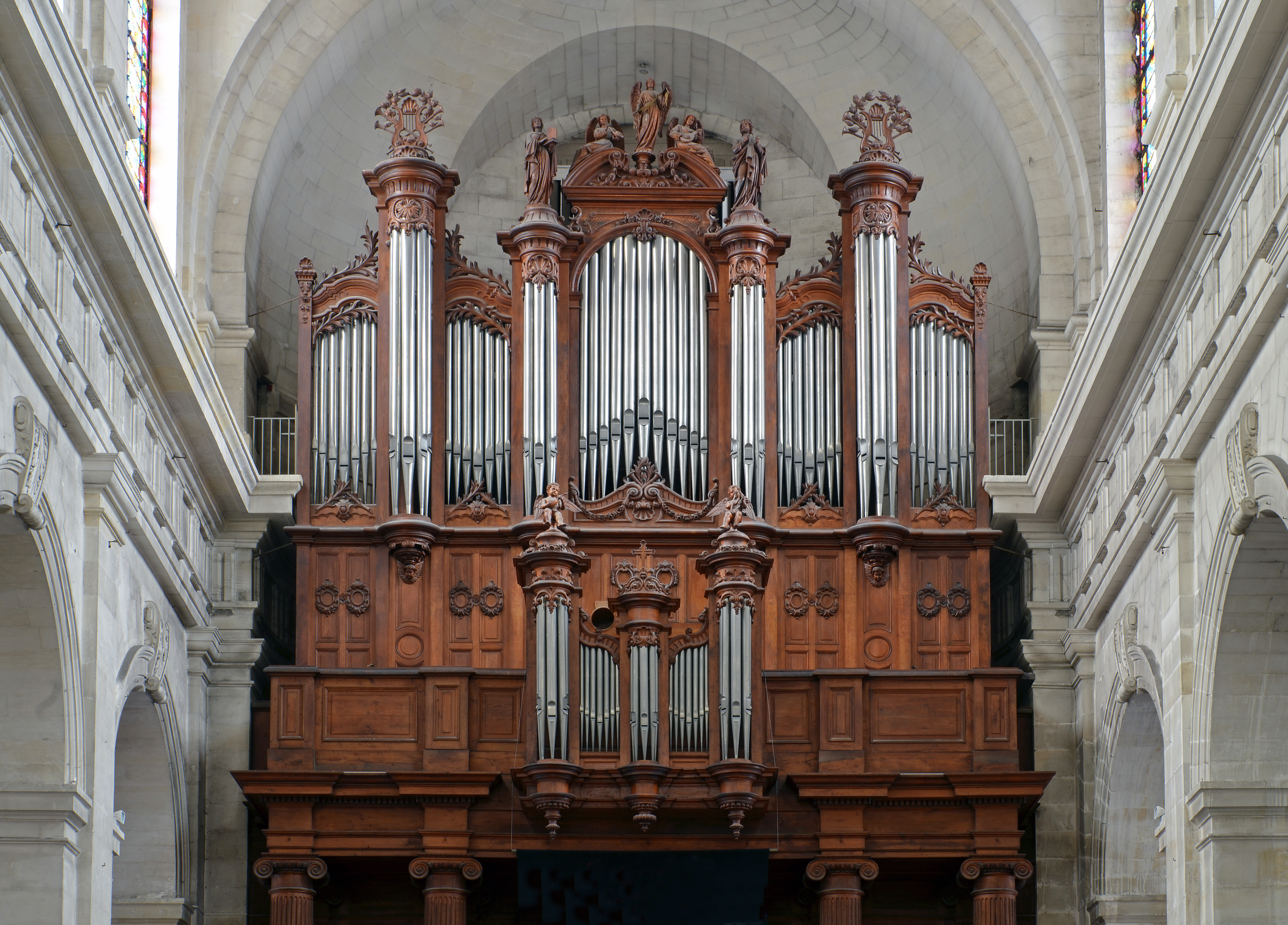
The grand organ of La Rochelle Cathedral, built by Merklin in 1866

Churches with organs built or restored by Joseph Merklin include:

- Murcia Cathedral, Murcia, Spain
- Notre-Dame de Clignancourt, Paris, France
- La Rochelle Cathedral, La Rochelle, France
- Guadalajara Cathedral, Jalisco, Mexico
- Monterrey Cathedral, Nuevo León, Mexico
- O.L.V.-ten-Poel Church, Tienen, Belgium
- Saint-Barthélemy, Liege, Belgium
- Saint-Eugène-Sainte-Cécile, Paris, France
- Saint-Georges, Lyon, France
- Saint-Michel Basilica, Bordeaux, France
- St. Peter's Church, Vorselaar, Belgium
- Strasbourg Cathedral, Strasbourg, France
- Grand Synagogue, Paris, France
- Temple du Marais, Paris, France
- Temple Neuf, Strasbourg, France
- Trinità dei Monti, Rome, Italy
- Troyes Cathedral Troyes, France
