= Roman Catholic Diocese of Maillezais =

Coordinates: 46.37°N 0.74°W

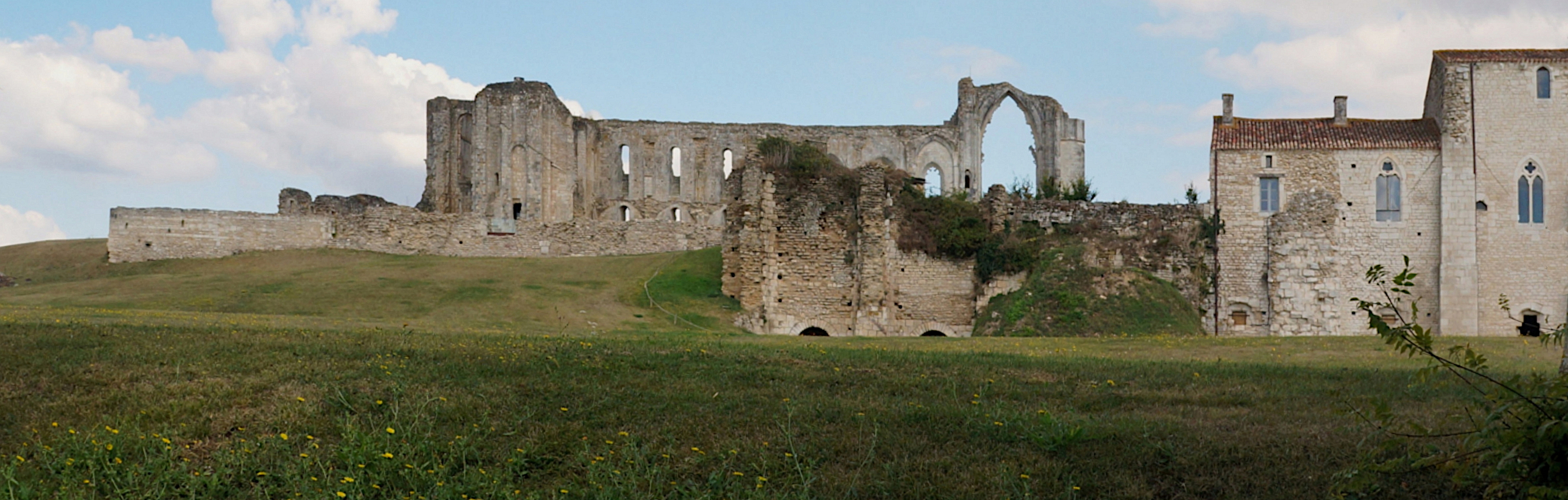
Ruins of the Cathedral of S. Pierre (Maillezais)

The former Catholic diocese of Maillezais in north-west France was erected in 1317, by Pope John XXII, and ceased to exist in 1648 when it was incorporated into the new diocese of La Rochelle. The town of Maillezais is now found in the department of Vendée, and most of the territory of the former diocese belongs to the diocese of Luçon.

== History ==
=== The abbey of Maillezais ===
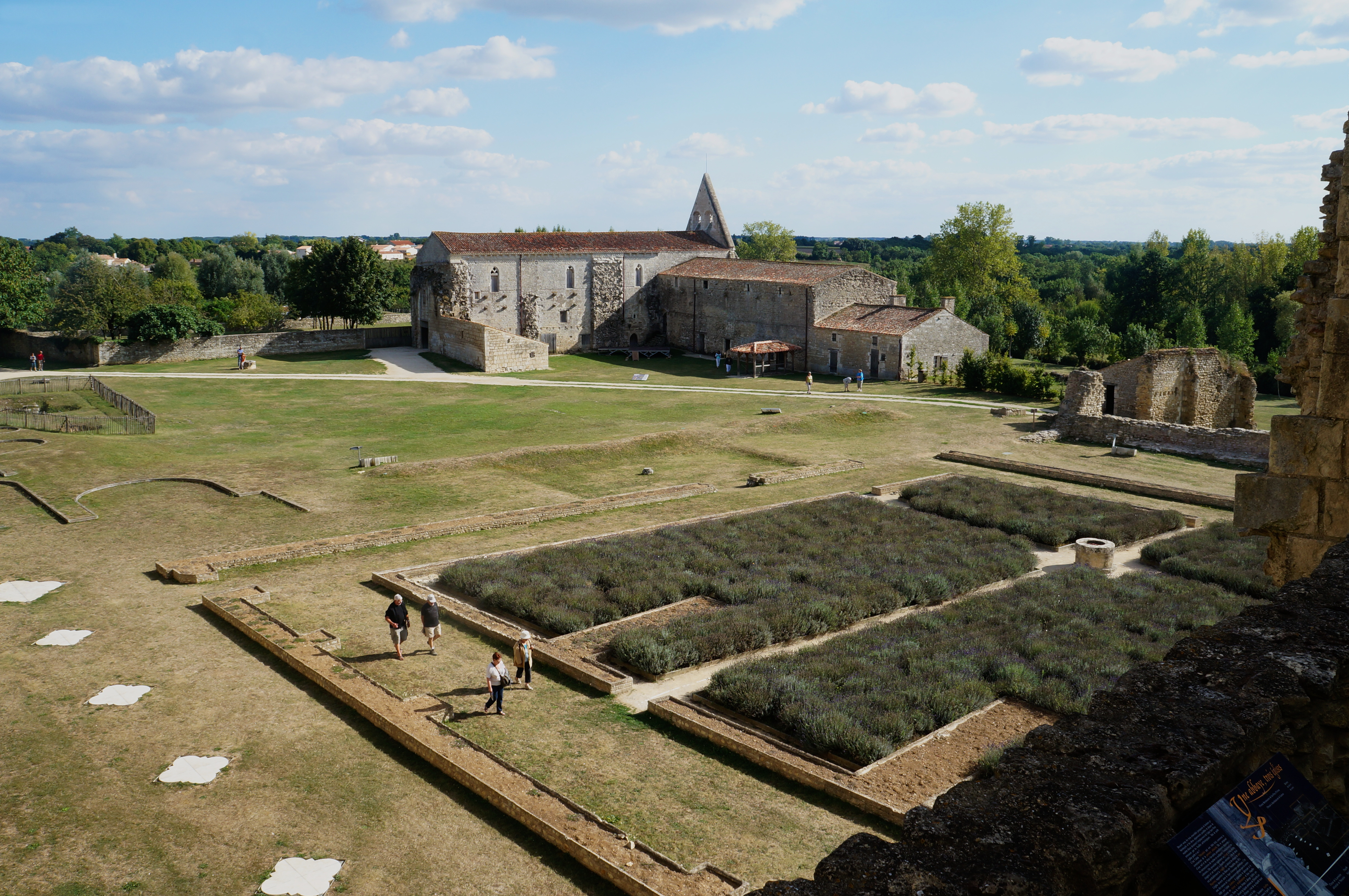
View of the cathedral ruins from the south transept tower

The Benedictine monastery of Maillezais was founded in about 989 by Gauzbert, Abbot of St-Julien de Tours, at the request of William IV, Duke of Aquitaine, and his wife Emma.

The seventh abbot of Maillezais, Abbot Pierre (about 1100), who followed Richard Cœur de Lion to the Third Crusade, composed a book on the foundation of the monastery of Maillezais, He claimed to be a lover of Cicero. He also wrote a prefatory epistle for the Historia Hierosolymitana of Archbishop Baldric of Dol. One must also mention the Chronicon Malleacense.

On 13 May 1197, by a solemn bull Officii nostri, subscribed by eighteen cardinals, Pope Clement III took the monastery of Maillezais under papal protection, listing all of its dependencies and properties. He also confirmed the dependence of the monastery on the Bishop of Poitiers for episcopal functions, such as the consecration of altars, the provision of holy chrism, and the consecration of monks and clerics. By the beginning of the seventeenth century, the Abbey of Maillezais owned priories and churches in the dioceses of Saintes, Luçon, Nantes, Poitiers, and Bordeaux, in addition to their holdings in Maillezais.

An anonymous monk of Saint Pierre de Maillezais wrote a historical work entitled, De monsterii Malleacensis devastatione facta a Gaufredo de Leziniaco, ca. 1332. Geoffroy de Leziniac (Luzignan) "la Grand' Dent" was the nephew of Guy de Lusignan, who became King of Jerusalem (1186–1192), and nephew of Aimery, who was Guy's successor (1197–1205). Geoffroy la Grand' Dent was compelled to seek absolution for his misdeeds against the abbey of Maillezais from Pope Gregory IX at Spoleto in 1232.

François Rabelais, who had begun a career in religion as a Franciscan at Fontenay-le-Comte, became, in 1524, with the special permission of Pope Clement VII, a Benedictine monk in the monastery of Maillezais. He became a friend of Geoffroy d'Estissac (1518–43), Bishop of Maillezais. He was gone before 1530, however, when he was at the University of Montpellier, studying medicine; by 1532 he was at the University of Poitiers, studying law. On 15 July 1532, François Rabelais, M.D., wrote to clarissimo doctissimoque Bishop d'Estissac, of his intention to dedicate his commentary on Hippocrates and Galen to the bishop.

=== Creation of the diocese of Maillezais ===
In 1317, Pope John XXII engaged in a major restructuring of the episcopal organization of southern and western France, both in territory governed by the King of France and territory governed by the King of England. On 13 August 1317, in the Bull Sane Considerantes, he divided the diocese of Poitiers, creating the new dioceses of Luçon and Maillezais, and erecting the monastery church of Maillezais into a cathedral. His stated reason was the large size of the diocese of Poitiers and its large population, which made it difficult for only one bishop to provide all the spiritual services needed. The Abbot of Maillezais of the time, Geoffroy de Pommereuil (Gaufredus Povereau), became the first Bishop, and the monks became the Canons of the cathedral. Bishop Geoffroy was consecrated in Avignon on 29 November 1317 by the Bishop of Ostia, Berengarius Fredoli. Geoffroy's successors were both bishop and abbot, and to deal with the affairs of the monastery, a Claustral Prior and a Subprior were appointed by the Abbot-Bishop. There was also a Provost, an Aumonier, a Sacristan, an Infirmarian and an 'Aquaticus Vargerio'. The monastic community followed the Rule of Saint Benedict. In 1648, when the seat of the bishop was transferred to the new diocese of La Rochelle, the Chapter was secularized (no longer composed of the monks of the Abbey of Maillezais) and was also moved to La Rochelle.

Huguenot control (purple) and influence (violet), 16th century

In 1585 the town of Maillezais was taken by Henri de Navarre. On 20 November 1586 the two companies of soldiers who garrisoned Maillezais were taken by surprise by the troops of Catherine de Medicis. The commander of one was killed, and the other lost an eye. They surrendered to the Marquis de Levardan and Captain Saint-Pompoint, who then became Governor of Maillezais. But next year in June, Henri de Navarre retook Maillezais, defended only by one monk and some locals, ordering the town to be fortified, and then returned to La Rochelle. Catherine's forces attacked again from Niort, and drove out the Huguenot companies. But the Protestants returned and sacked the abbey of Maillezais in reprisal, damaging the cathedral.

In 1588 the Duc de Joyeuse and the Catholic army besieged Maillezais and forced the surrender of the Huguenot garrison, but in the last days of December, the Huguenot forces led by Théodore-Agrippa d'Aubigné retook the city. D'Aubigné took up residence in the episcopal palace. When the Cardinal de Bourbon, who was saluted by the League as King Charles X, was captured by the forces of the new King Henri IV, he was moved from Chinon for greater security, and spent a short time at Maillezais, until he was transferred to Fontenay-le-Comte, where he died on 9 May 1590. D'Aubigné remained as governor of Maillezais, though continuing to campaign with Henry of Navarre, and was with him on the day that Henri III was assassinated. After he became King of France, d'Aubigné frequently visited the Court. He was bought out of the office of Governor of Maillezais by the Duc de Rohan, and on 24 May 1621, Maillezais returned to the possession of King Louis XIII. Its population, after more than thirty years of Huguenot occupation, had mostly become Protestant.

During the war between King Louis XIII and the Huguenots, culminating in the siege of La Rochelle (1627–1628), the cathedral was destroyed. Efforts were made by Cardinal Richelieu to assist Bishop Henri de Bethune to undertake reconstruction, but King Louis XIII decided that the headquarters of the diocese should be moved to Fontenay-le-Comte. On 26 September 1629 he issued a brevet, authorizing the transfer of the episcopal seat from Maillezais to Fontenay-le-Comte, as well as the secularizing of the Chapter of Maillezais, and permitting the request to be made formally to the Papacy. On 14 January 1631 Pope Urban VIII, with a view to a more active struggle against Protestantism, issued bulls which would have transferred the residence of the Bishop of Maillezais to Fontenay-le-Comte. But, as Pope Innocent X noted in his bull, the transfer was never put into effect, considering that Fontenay was much smaller than had been portrayed, and not in keeping with the dignity of an episcopal see. On 4 May 1648 the see of Maillezais was in fact suppressed by Pope Innocent X in the Bull In supereminenti, and confirmed by letters patent of King Louis XIV.

=== Annexation of Maillezais to new diocese of La Rochelle ===
The territory of Maillezais was annexed, along with the tiny province of Aunis and the Isle of Ré, both of which had been detached from the Diocese of Saintes in order to form the diocese of La Rochelle. The bull of Innocent X assigned the new diocese of La Rochelle to the metropolitanate of Bordeaux. The Chapter of the Cathedral of Saintes, which was losing a number of parishes and benefices in the territory which was being annexed to the new diocese of La Rochelle, protested and engaged in negotiations which were not concluded until 15 May 1650. The Benedictines of Saint-Maur also entered protests, according to a memorial of 1653. There was also opposition to the registration of the bull of Pope Innocent X from several priors of abbeys who were dependent upon the Abbey of Maillezais, and they successfully held up legal matters until finally, over their opposition, the Parliament of Paris registered the bull on 7 March 1665.

On 16 November 1666, the Bishop of Poitiers, as commissioner of the Holy See, read out the bull of secularization, bringing to an end the history of the diocese and abbey of Maillezais. A few monks requested and received permission to stay on in the abbey precincts for the rest of their lives.

== Bishops ==
- Gaufredus Povereau, O.S.B. (13 August 1317 – 1333)
- Guillelmus Sambuti (1333 – c.1343)
- Joannes (1343 – c.1358)
- Guy (20 February 1359 – c.1380)
- Joannes Roucelli, O.P. (4 June 1380 – 2 May 1382)
- Pierre de Thury (2 May 1382 – July 1385)
- Jean le Masle (1385–1420)
- Guillaume de Lucé (16 October 1420 – 38)
- Thibaud de Lucé (6 March 1438–55)
- Louis Rounault
- Jean d'Amboise (31 July 1475 – 18 June 1481)
- Federico di Sanseverino d'Aragona (5 November 1481 – 1508)
- Cardinal Pietro Accolti (1511–1518)
- Cardinal Philippe de Luxembourg (10–24 March 1518) (Administrator)
- Geoffroy d'Estissac (24 March 1518 – )
- Jacques d'Escoubleau (27 June 1543 – )
- Pierre de Pontlevoy (10 March 1561 – )
- Henri I d'Escoubleau de Sourdis (16 June 1572 – April 1615)
- François d'Escoubleau de Sourdis (Coadjutor) (4 July 1605 – 1615)
- Henri II de Sourdis d'Escoubleau (1615–1629)
- Henri de Bethune (19 November 1629 – 4 May 1648)

The diocese became part of the new Diocese of La Rochelle in 1648.

== See also ==
- Catholic Church in France
- List of Catholic dioceses in France
- Maillezais Cathedral

== Bibliography ==
=== Reference works ===
- Gams, Pius Bonifatius (1873). Series episcoporum Ecclesiae catholicae: quotquot innotuerunt a beato Petro apostolo. Ratisbon: Typis et Sumptibus Georgii Josephi Manz. (Use with caution; obsolete)
- Eubel, Conradus, ed. (1913). Hierarchia catholica, Tomus 1 (second ed.). Münster: Libreria Regensbergiana. (in Latin)
- Eubel, Conradus, ed. (1914). Hierarchia catholica, Tomus 2 (second ed.). Münster: Libreria Regensbergiana. (in Latin)
- Gulik, Guilelmus (1923). Eubel, Conradus (ed.). Hierarchia catholica, Tomus 3 (second ed.). Münster: Libreria Regensbergiana.
- Gauchat, Patritius (Patrice) (1935). Hierarchia catholica IV (1592–1667). Münster: Libraria Regensbergiana.
- Ritzler, Remigius; Sefrin, Pirminus (1952). Hierarchia catholica medii et recentis aevi V (1667–1730). Patavii: Messagero di S. Antonio.
- Ritzler, Remigius; Sefrin, Pirminus (1958). Hierarchia catholica medii et recentis aevi VI (1730–1799). Patavii: Messagero di S. Antonio.

=== Studies ===
- Aillery, Eugène (1860). Pouillé de l'Evêché de Luçon (in French and Latin). Fontenay-le-Comte: Imprimerie de Robuchon. pp. 135–201.
- Bertrand, Louis (1902). La vie de Messire Henry de Béthune: archevèque de Bordeaux (1604–1680) (in French). Paris: A. Picard. pp. 94–161.
- Bord, Lucien-Jean (2007). Maillezais: histoire d'une abbaye et d'un évêché (in French). Paris: Geuthner. ISBN 978-2-7053-3790-2.
- Brochet, Louis (1900). Maillezais: son histoire, son passé (in French). Fontenay-le-Comte: impr. C. Claireaux.
- Du Tems, Hugues (1774). Le clergé de France (in French). Vol. Tome second. Paris: Delalain. pp. 516–549.
- Jean, Armand (1891). Les évêques et les archevêques de France depuis 1682 jusqu'à 1801 (in French). Paris: A. Picard.
- Lacurie, Joseph-Louis (1852). Histoire de l'abbaye de Maillezais depuis sa fondation jusqu'à nos jours, suivie de pièces justificatives la plupart inédites (in French). Fontenay-le-Comte: E. Fillon.
- Pouillié general, contenant les benefices de l'archeuesche' de Bordeaux. Et des dioceses d'Agen, Condom, Eugoulesme, Luçon, Maillezais, Perigueux, Poictiers, Xaintes, Sarlat. Auecaussi les abbayes, prieurés, doyennez, chapitres, cures, chapelles, ... Le tout selon les memoires pris sur les originaux desdits dioceses & registres du Clergé de France, ainsi qu' ils ont esté ordonnez en l'assemblée de Mante l'an 1641. . (in French). Paris: Gervais Alliot. 1648. pp. 157–214.
- Sainte-Marthe, Denis de (1720). Gallia Christiana, In Provincias Ecclesiasticas Distributa (in Latin). Vol. Tomus secundus. Paris: Typographia Regia. pp. 1368–1403.
