= St. Pierre Cathedral, Saint-Pierre =

St. Pierre Cathedral Cathédrale Saint-Pierre de Saint-Pierre (in French)
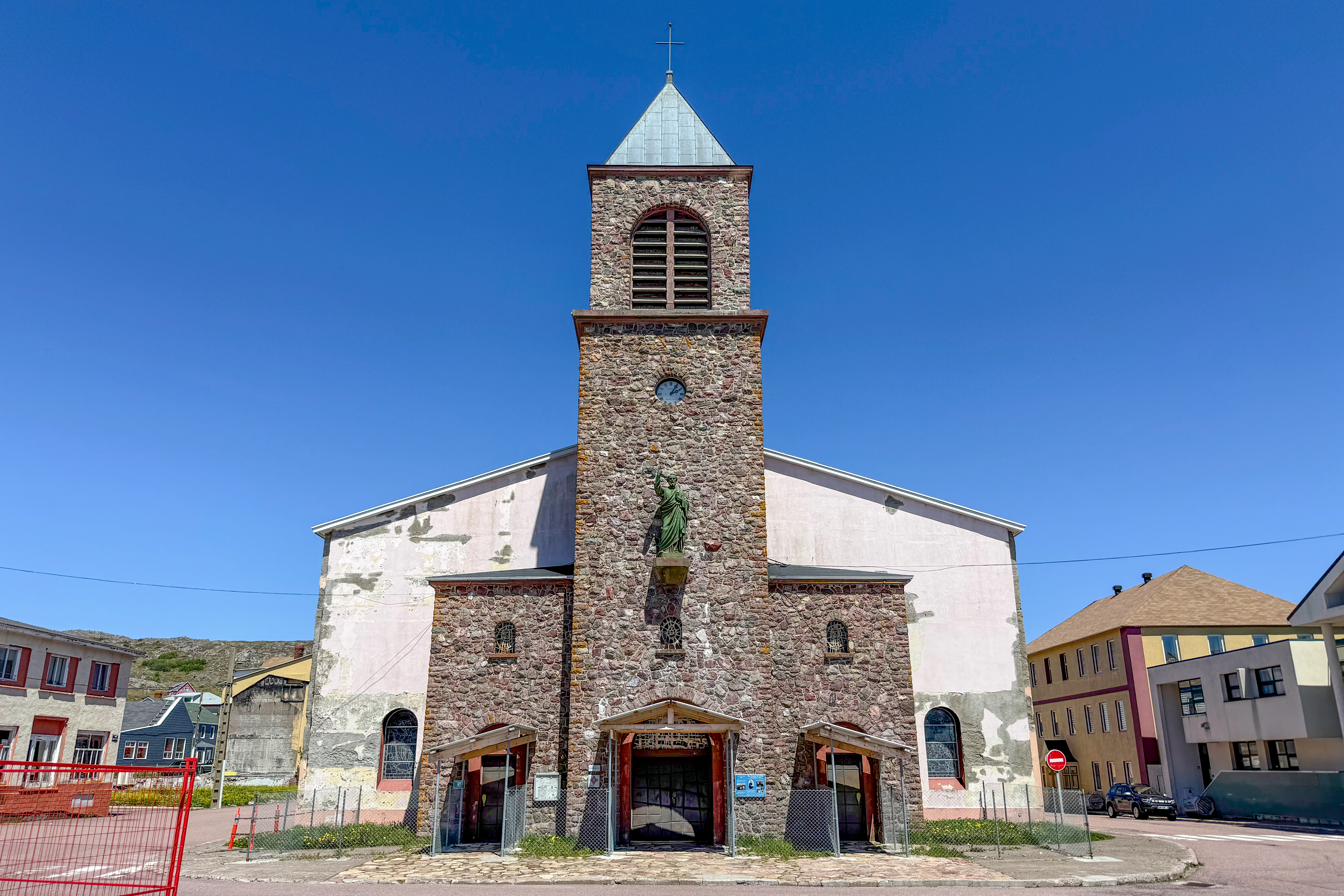
- St. Pierre Cathedral in 2026

- 46°46′52″N 56°10′20″W
- Location: Rue Jacques Cartier, Saint-Pierre
- Country: Saint Pierre and Miquelon, France
- Denomination: Roman Catholic

History
- Status: Parish in the Catholic Church

Architecture
- Functional status: Active
- Groundbreaking: 1905
- Completed: 1907

Administration
- Diocese: Roman Catholic Diocese of La Rochelle and Saintes

Clergy
- Bishop: Georges Colomb

St. Pierre Cathedral (French: Cathédrale Saint-Pierre de Saint-Pierre) is an early 20th-century church that served as the cathedral of the Roman Catholic Vicariate Apostolic of Iles Saint Pierre and Miquelon before it was dissolved in 2018. It is now part of the Roman Catholic Diocese of La Rochelle and Saintes. The church is located close to the harbour front of the capital city on the rue Jacques Cartier.

A church was first constructed in the late 17th century, opening in 1690. Due to the Great Fire of 1902, the current structure dates back to 1907. The church is noted for containing stained glass windows that were donated by Charles de Gaulle.

== History ==
In 1668, French settlers began inhabiting the islands, bringing their Catholic faith along with them. Construction of the cathedral most likely started after this time and it was completed in 1690. The building remained standing until November 1902, when it was obliterated—along with the majority of the town—in the Great Fire, which originated from the cathedral. St. Pierre was subsequently rebuilt from 1905 to 1907 using Basque-style architecture.

== Architecture ==
=== Exterior ===
St. Pierre Cathedral was built in the Basque style of architecture and is noted for its mixture of European and local Saint-Pierrais features in its design. This is demonstrated in the church's incorporation of Alsatian sandstone and native pink granite.

When the cathedral was rebuilt in 1905, the reconstruction used cement—an innovative construction material at the time. However, this did not withstand the elements well and resulted in damage to the exterior walls. As a result, restoration was undertaken in 1975, with the belfry being completely rebuilt.

=== Stained glass windows ===
The church contains both early 20th century and modern stained glass windows. The former depicts saints from France—St. Marguerite Marie Alacoque, St. Bernadette and Our Lady of Lourdes—as well as the cathedral's namesake in Montmartre, whose architectural style was emulated by the cathedral. The modern windows were given by Charles de Gaulle during his 1967 visit to the overseas territory. These show scenes from the Gospel involving the sea and ships—a symbol of the islands depicted on their unofficial flag—as well as Pope John XXIII convening the Second Vatican Council.

== See also ==
- Roman Catholic Vicariate Apostolic of Iles Saint Pierre and Miquelon
- Roman Catholic Diocese of La Rochelle and Saintes
