= Émile Le Camus =

French Catholic priest, preacher, theologian, scripturist and bishop

Émile-Paul-Angel Constant Le Camus
- Bishop of La Rochelle and Saintes
- Church: Catholic Church
- Diocese: Diocese of La Rochelle and Saintes
- In office: 18 April 1901 – 28 September 1906
- Predecessor: Edwin Bonnefoy
- Successor: Jean-Auguste Eyssautier

Orders
- Ordination: 20 December 1862
- Consecration: 2 July 1901 by Victor-Lucien-Sulpice Lécot

Personal details
- Born: 24 August 1839 Paraza, Aude, Kingdom of France
- Died: 28 September 1906 (aged 67) Castelnaudary, Aude, French Republic

Émile-Paul-Constant-Ange Le Camus (b. at Paraza, 24 August 1839; d. at Malvisade, near Castelnaudary, 28 September 1906) was a French Catholic priest, known as a preacher, theologian, scripturist, Bishop of La Rochelle and Saintes.

== Life ==
Émile Le Camus made his preparatory studies at Carcassonne, and then entered the theological seminary of St-Sulpice at, Paris. In 1861 he went to Rome, where he received his doctorate in theology, and in the following year, 20 December 1862, he was ordained priest at Carcassonne, France. He was a remarkable orator, and in 1867 he was invited to preach the Lenten sermons at Avignon, for which he was made honorary canon. This same honour was again conferred upon him somewhat later by Félix de Las Cases, Bishop of Constantine (Algeria), who also chose Le Camus as his theologian at the First Vatican Council. In 1875 Le Camus was appointed assistant director of the Dominican Order's school at Sorez, France, but soon after he became head of the new school of St. Francis de Sales, which he established at Castelnaudary. Here he worked until 1887, when he resigned his position as director in order to devote himself exclusively to the study of the New Testament.

To equip himself properly for this study, and especially to study the topography of Palestine, he made his first journey to the East in the following year (1888). This was followed by several other visits, and the results of his travels and studies were published at various times. While pursuing his Scriptural studies, Le Camus also found time to preach several ecclesiastical retreats at Lyon, Montpellier, Paris, and Rome. In 1897 he was elected theological canon of Carcassonne, and on 6 April 1901, he received his appointment as Bishop of La Rochelle and Saintes. He was consecrated at Carcassonne, 2 July 1901, by Victor-Lucien-Sulpice Lécot.

== Works ==
As bishop, Émile Le Camus continued his work on the New Testament, and also published several letters and pamphlets on ecclesiastical topics.

His works include:

- La Vie de Notre Seigneur Jésus-Christ, 3 vols., 6th ed., 1901 (translated into English, German, and Italian)
- Voyages aux Sept Eglises de l'Apocalypse
- Notre Voyage aux Pays Bibliques, 3 vols., 1889–90
- L'Œuvre des Apôtres, 3 vols., 1905
- Les Enfants de Nazareth
- Vraie et Fausse Exégèse"
- Lettre sur la Formation Ecclésiastique des Séminaristes
- Lettre réglant la réorganization des études ecclésiastiques
- Mémoire addressé à MM. les députés membres de la Commission des Congrégations, Bulletin Trimestriel des Anciens Elèves de St-Sulpice, n. xliii (15 Nov., 1906). 450–54; New York Review, II. n. iii, 498; II, vi, 773–80.
