= Pierre-Antoine Bozo =

French Catholic bishop (born 1966)

The Most Reverend Pierre-Antoine Bozo
- Coadjutor Bishop of La Rochelle
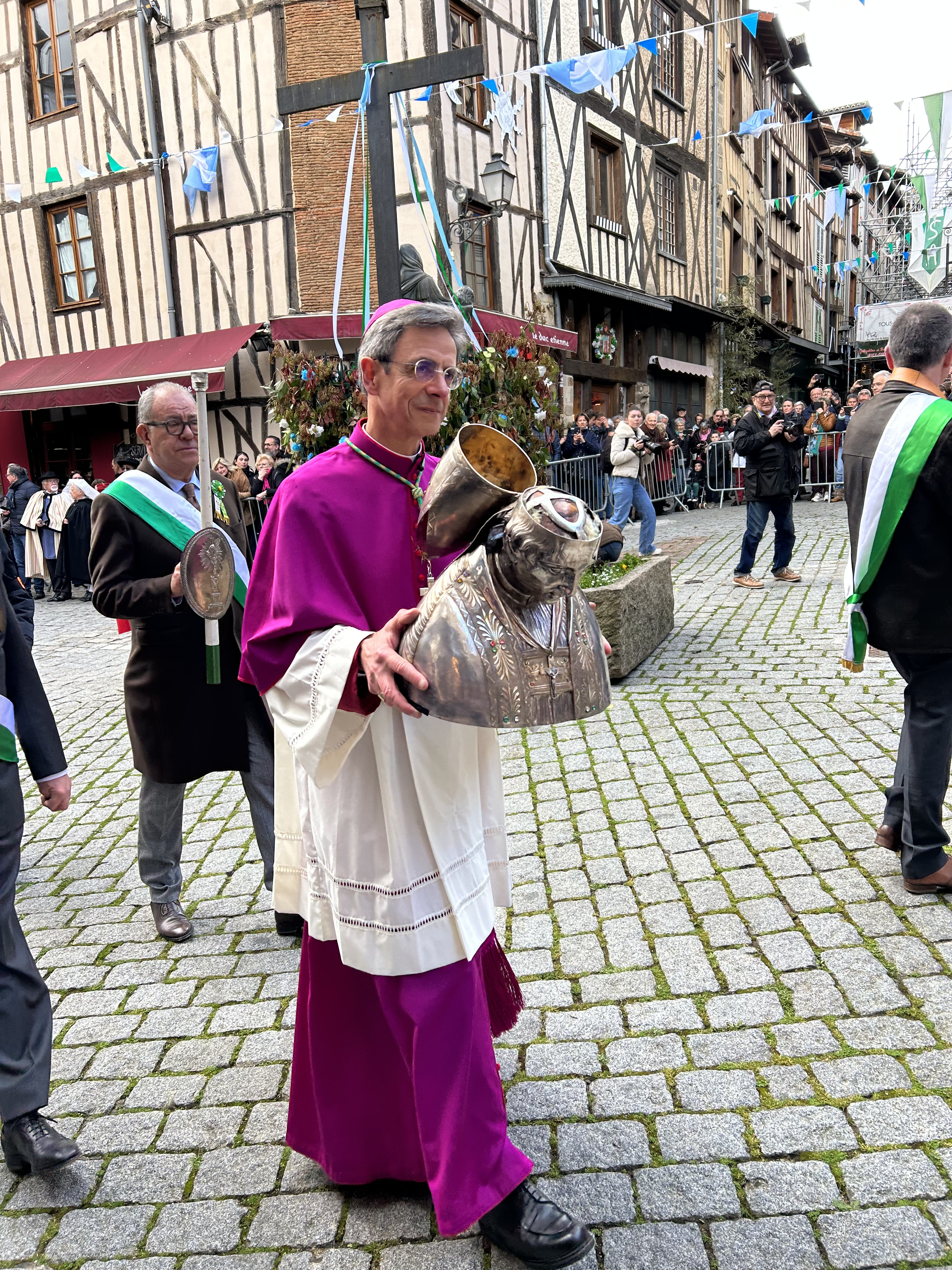
- Bozo processing with the exposed relic of Saint Aurelian of Limoges in 2023.
- Diocese: La Rochelle
- Appointed: 19 August 2025
- Installed: 19 October 2025
- Previous post: Bishop of Limoges (2017–2025)

Orders
- Ordination: 3 July 1994
- Consecration: 3 September 2017 by Pascal Wintzer

Personal details
- Born: 14 March 1966 (age 60) Argentan (Orne), France
- Motto: Caritas Christi urget nos (Latin for 'The love of Christ impels us')
- Coat of arms

Pierre-Antoine Bozo (born 14 March 1966) is a French prelate of the Catholic Church who has been the bishop coadjutor of La Rochelle since 2025, with the full authority to act as bishop of the diocese. He previously served as bishop of Limoges from 2017 to 2025.

== Biography ==
Pierre-Antoine Bozo was born on 14 March 1966 in Argentan (Orne), the son of Antoine Bozo, who managed stud farms for race horses, and Claire Roquette. His cousin Dominique Bozo (1935–1993) played a prominent role in the management of French art institutions. He studied at the Faculty of Law of the University of Caen Normandy, earning his licentiate in jurisprudence. From 1988 to 1995 he lived at the Pontifical French Seminary in Rome and studied at the Pontifical Gregorian University, obtaining a licentiate in dogmatic theology, with a specialty in ecclesiology. He was ordained a priest for the Diocese of Séez on 3 July 1994. He continued his studies at the Gregorian for another year after his ordination.

He served as parish vicar of Notre-Dame Saint-Léonard and chaplain of public teachers and students in Alençon from 1995 to 2005; diocesan head of service for vocations from 1997 to 2003; diocesan head of youth pastoral ministry from 2003 to 2007; vice rector of the Saint-Jean-Eudes interdiocesan seminary in Caen from 2007 to 2012; episcopal vicar of Séez from 2011 to 2015; rector of the Saint-Jean-Eudes seminary and administrator of the Sainte-Opportune parish in the Pays d'Ô from 2012 to 2015. From 2015 to 2017 he served as vicar general and moderator of the episcopal curia of Séez and pastor of Sainte-Opportune. He was a professor at the Centre d’Études Théologiques de Caen from 1997 to 2017. In 2016 he was named dean of Séez.

On 11 May 2017, Pope Francis appointed him bishop of Limoges. He received his episcopal consecration on 3 September from Archbishop Pascal Wintzer of Poitiers.

On 19 August 2025, Pope Leo XIV named him bishop coadjutor of La Rochelle, with all the authority normally vested in the bishop. (Note: Georges Colomb, Bishop of La Rochelle, continues to hold that title though he has been relieved of his authority since June 2023, pending resolution of criminal charges against him.) His installation took place on 19 October.

He is serving a three-year term (2022–2025) as a member of the permanent council of the French Episcopal Conference.
