= Saint Catherine Church of Loix =

19th-century church in France

- Église Sainte-Catherine de Loix
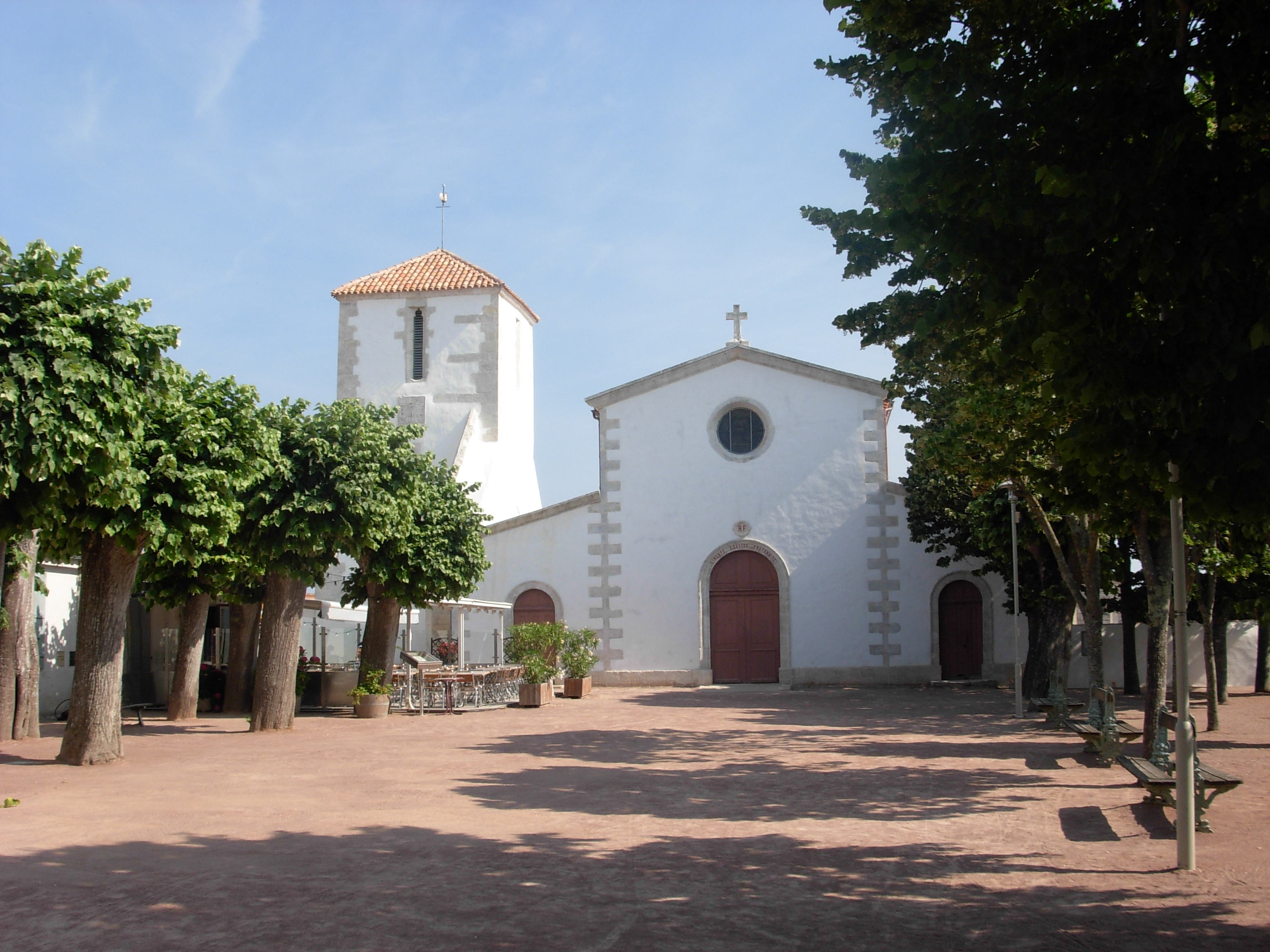
- Facade of the church

Religion
- Affiliation: Catholic
- Region: Nouvelle-Aquitaine
- Rite: Catholic Church
- Year consecrated: January 30, 1831

Location
- Municipality: Loix
- Country: France
- Interactive map of Saint Catherine Church of Loix
- Coordinates: 46.2244°N 1.4381°W

Architecture
- Architect: Antoine Brossard
- Style: Romanesque architecture
- Established: Unknown
- Completed: 1873
- Inscriptions: Liberté, Égalité, Fraternité

The Church of Saint Catherine is a parish church located in Loix, in the department of Charente-Maritime, the region of Nouvelle-Aquitaine and the diocese of La Rochelle and Saintes.

== History ==
The exact date of the construction of the church is unknown. It is mentioned for the first time in 1379, after having been erected as a parish by Bernard II du Sault, bishop of Saintes, on 7 July of the same year. The roof of the church is renovated in 1627. Between 1636 and 1642, new baptismal font are installed and a sacristy is added between 1636 and 1653. On several occasions during the 17th century the church is enlarged and decorated.

After the French Revolution, in 1793, part of the religious objects are sent to the Monnaie de La Rochelle to be melted. Oreillan, the priest of Loix of that period, seeing the pillages committed by the republicans, steals with Aunis, an accomplice from Ars, sacred vases in order to protect them. The misappropriation is however discovered and they are both tried before the Revolutionary Tribunal, and later decapitated. The year after in 1794 the remaining furniture of the church is sold in auction. The building becomes momentarily a Temple of Reason.

In 1827, part of the structure of the nave collapses. Moreover, the steeple is no longer plumb. Antoine Brossard, architect of the Charente-Inférieure department and diocesan architect, therefore undertakes in 1830 the reconstruction as well as the enlargement of the church, which will be realized by Jean-Baptiste Malardier, masonry contractor. On January 30, 1831, the church is blessed. The following year, the church tower is repaired by carpenter Félix Bonnaudet. In 1843, the bell is restored by the founder Pierre Huard and the alleys are paved by the mason Eloi Texier. The grandstand is built in 1862 by Amédée Guillet and various renovation works are carried out between 1832 and 1896. In 1873, a new chapel is built for the baptismal font. In 1877, work is done by Fournier, at the bell-tower and on the stained-glass windows. Bricklayer Prosper Banier, of Ars, restores the roof in 1896.

Following the law on the separation of churches and the state in 1905, the Republican motto "Liberty, Equality, Fraternity" is engraved on the pediment of St. Catherine's Church, and it is still visible today. Moreover, the church becomes the property of the commune.

During the years 1980 and 1984, the building is renovated and new stained glass windows created by Aramis Pentecôte, master glassmaker, are installed. Important restoration work in partnership with the Fondation du Patrimoine took place in 2008.

== Ex-Voto ==
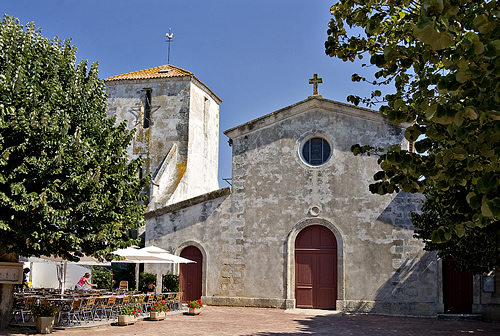
Facade before the restoration of 2008

Sainte-Catherine contains two ex-voto ships.

The first is a model frigate suspended from the vault of the nave dating from the late 18th or early 19th century. It is built in three-masted squares and is equipped with 44 cannons on two sides. Its prow is endowed with a character in republican colors and its hull made on slats. It is made of polychrome wood.

The second ex-voto is a model of the "Tikocco", race track, which was created after the tragedy of the Fastnet in 1979. This famous race which turned very quickly to the drama in August 1979, caused 15 victims. The ship model is offered in recognition by survivors.
