= Jacques David (bishop) =

French Roman Catholic bishop (1930–2018)

- Bishop of Évreux
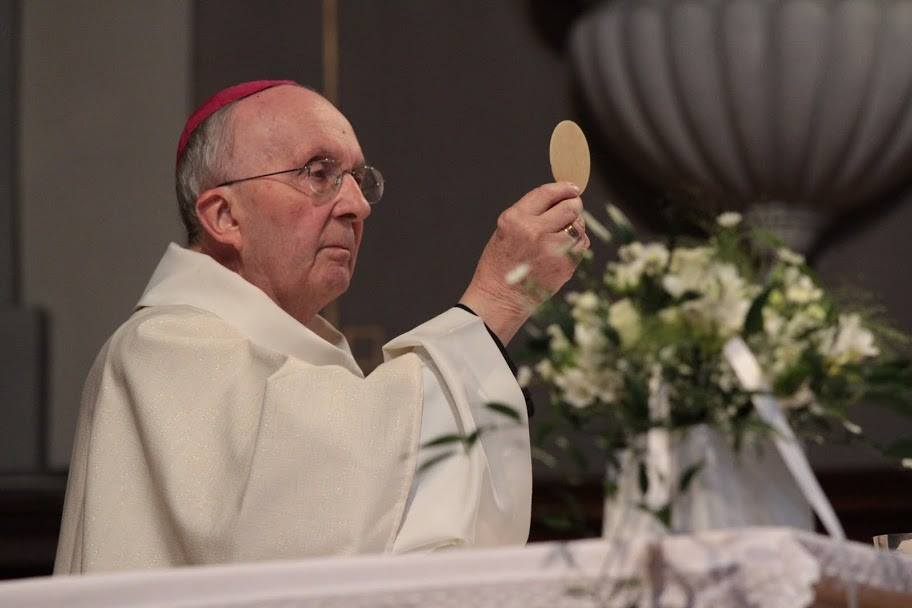
- Church: Catholic Church
- Diocese: Diocese of Évreux
- In office: 2 February 1996 – 28 January 2006
- Predecessor: Jacques Gaillot
- Successor: Christian Nourrichard
- Previous posts: Bishop of La Rochelle and Saintes (1985-1996); Titular Bishop of Girba (1981-1985); Auxiliary Bishop of Bordeaux (1981-1985)

Orders
- Ordination: 29 June 1956 by Antoine-Marie Cazaux
- Consecration: 26 September 1981 by Charles-Auguste-Marie Paty

Personal details
- Born: Jacques Louis Antoine Marie David; 22 December 1930 Saint-Aubin-la-Plaine, Vendée, France
- Died: 19 December 2018 (aged 87) La Roche-sur-Yon, Vendée, France

Jacques Louis Antoine Marie David (22 December 1930 – 19 December 2018) was a French Roman Catholic bishop.

He was born in France and was ordained to the priesthood in 1956. He served as titular bishop of Girba and as auxiliary bishop of the Roman Catholic Archdiocese of Bordeaux, France, from 1981 to 1986. He served as bishop of the Roman Catholic Diocese of La Rochelle and Saintes, France, from 1986 to 1996. David served as bishop of the Roman Catholic Diocese of Évreux, France, from 1996 to 2006.
