= Léon-Benoît-Charles Thomas =

French cardinal

His Eminence Léon-Benoît-Charles Thomas
- Archbishop of Rouen
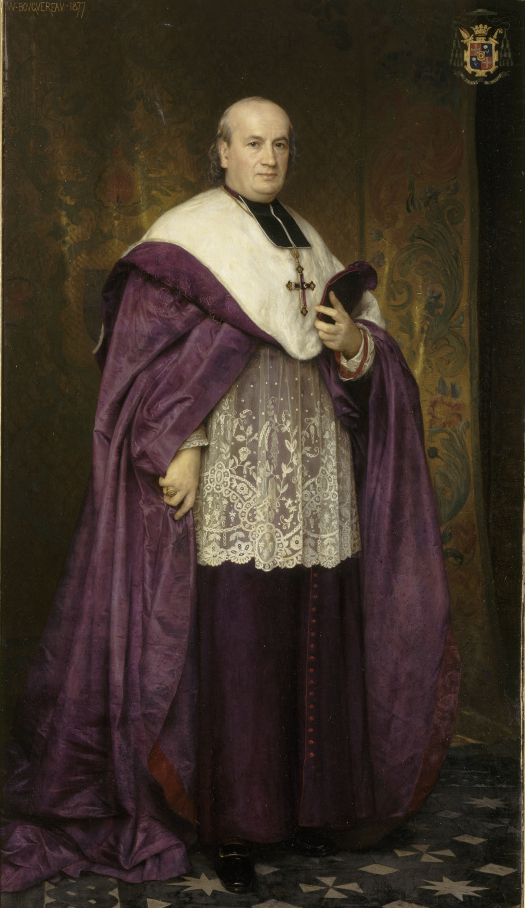
- Church: Roman Catholic Church
- Archdiocese: Rouen
- See: Rouen
- Appointed: 24 March 1884
- Term ended: 9 March 1894
- Predecessor: Henri-Marie-Gaston Boisnormand de Bonnechose
- Successor: Guillaume-Marie-Romain Sourrieau
- Other post: Cardinal-Priest of Santa Maria Nuova (1893-94)
- Previous post: Bishop of La Rochelle (1867-84)

Orders
- Ordination: 21 December 1850
- Consecration: 15 May 1867 by Jean-Baptiste-François-Anne-Thomas Landriot
- Created cardinal: 16 January 1893 by Pope Leo XIII
- Rank: Cardinal-Priest

Personal details
- Born: Léon-Benoît-Charles Thomas; 30 May 1826 Paray-le-Monial, Autun, French Kingdom
- Died: 9 March 1894 (aged 67) Rouen, French Third Republic
- Buried: Rouen Cathedral
- Motto: Nil forties nil dulcius
- Coat of arms

Léon-Benoît-Charles Thomas (1826–1894) was a French cardinal.

He studied in Paris and Rome and earned a doctorate in theology in 1856.

He served as Bishop of La Rochelle (1867–1883) and Archbishop of Rouen (1883–1894).

He died in 1894 and was buried in the chapel of Sainte-Marguerite in Rouen; bombings during WWII damaged his tomb, and his remains were transferred to the crypt of the archbishops in the chapel of the Sainte-Vierge.
