= Lucien Fischer =

French Roman Catholic bishop (born 1933)

The Most Reverend Lucien Fischer C.S.Sp.
- Apostolic Vicar Emeritus of Saint Pierre and Miquelon
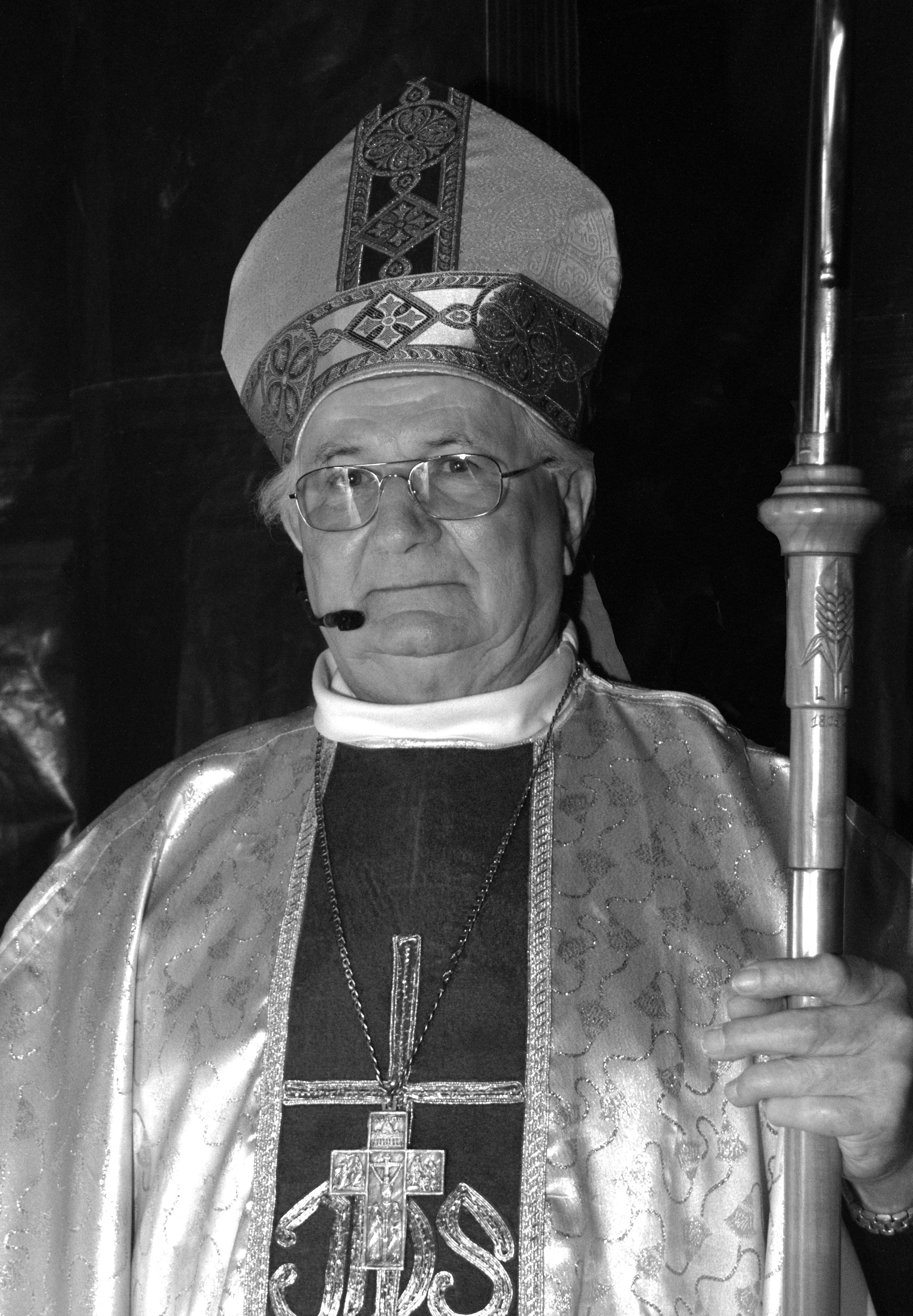
- Bishop Fischer in 2013
- Church: Catholic Church
- Appointed: 17 February 2000
- Installed: 18 June 2000
- Term ended: 19 June 2009
- Predecessor: François Joseph Maurer
- Successor: Pierre-Marie Gaschy
- Other post: Titular bishop of Avioccala (since 2000)

Orders
- Ordination: 30 September 1962 by José Hascher, C.S.Sp.
- Consecration: 18 June 2000 by Joseph Doré

Personal details
- Born: 27 November 1933 (age 92) Strasbourg, France
- Motto: Enracinés dans le Christ

Lucien Prosper Ernest Fischer C.S.Sp. (born 27 November 1933) is a French Roman Catholic bishop and member of the Congregation of the Holy Spirit. He served as Apostolic Vicar of Saint Pierre and Miquelon from 2000 to 2009 and was concurrently titular bishop of Avioccala.

== Early life and priesthood ==
Fischer was born in Strasbourg, France, on 27 November 1933. He entered the novitiate of the Spiritans at Cellule in the Puy-de-Dôme in 1953. After philosophical studies at Mortain and national service in Germany and Algeria, he undertook theological studies at Chevilly-Larue from 1960. He made his perpetual profession in the Congregation of the Holy Spirit on 28 March 1962 and was ordained a priest on 30 September 1962.

From 1963 to 1993, Fischer worked as a missionary in Gabon. He served successively as a vicar and parish priest at the mission of Koulamoutou, and in 1980 became parish priest of Moanda and vicar general of the Diocese of Franceville. From 1982 to 1988 he was superior of the Spiritan district in Gabon and was involved in the development of the Daniel Brottier major seminary in Libreville.

In 1993, Fischer returned to France and became regional superior of the Spiritans in eastern France. He also served as chaplain to the Communauté des îles in the diocesan ministry for migrants. The French Bishops' Conference lists him as regional superior of the Spiritans in eastern France before his appointment as Apostolic Vicar.

== Episcopate ==
On 17 February 2000, Pope John Paul II appointed Fischer Apostolic Vicar of Saint-Pierre-et-Miquelon and assigned him the titular see of Avioccala. The appointment was announced by the Holy See on 12 April 2000; the announcement described Fischer as a former missionary in Gabon and then regional superior of the Congregation of the Holy Spirit in eastern France.

The appointment was also recorded in the Acta Apostolicae Sedis, where Fischer is named as titular bishop of Avioccala and appointed Apostolic Vicar of the Islands of Saint Peter and Miquelon. The entry appears in the 2000 volume under the provisions of the Congregation for the Evangelization of Peoples.

Fischer was consecrated a bishop on 18 June 2000. His principal consecrator was Joseph Doré, Archbishop of Strasbourg; the co-consecrators were James Hector MacDonald, Archbishop of Saint John's, Newfoundland, and Timothée Modibo-Nzockena, Bishop of Franceville.

As Apostolic Vicar, Fischer headed the Apostolic Vicariate of Iles Saint Pierre and Miquelon, an ecclesiastical jurisdiction that does not have the status of a diocese in the Catholic Church. He served in the office from 2000 until 2009.

== Retirement ==
On 19 June 2009, Pope Benedict XVI accepted Fischer's resignation from the pastoral government of the Apostolic Vicariate of Saint-Pierre-et-Miquelon in accordance with Canon 401 §1 of the 1983 Code of Canon Law. Pierre-Marie Gaschy, C.S.Sp., was appointed his successor and was assigned the titular see of Usinaza.

Fischer is listed by the French Bishops' Conference as Apostolic Vicar Emeritus of Saint-Pierre-et-Miquelon from 2009.
