= Maillezais =

- Commune
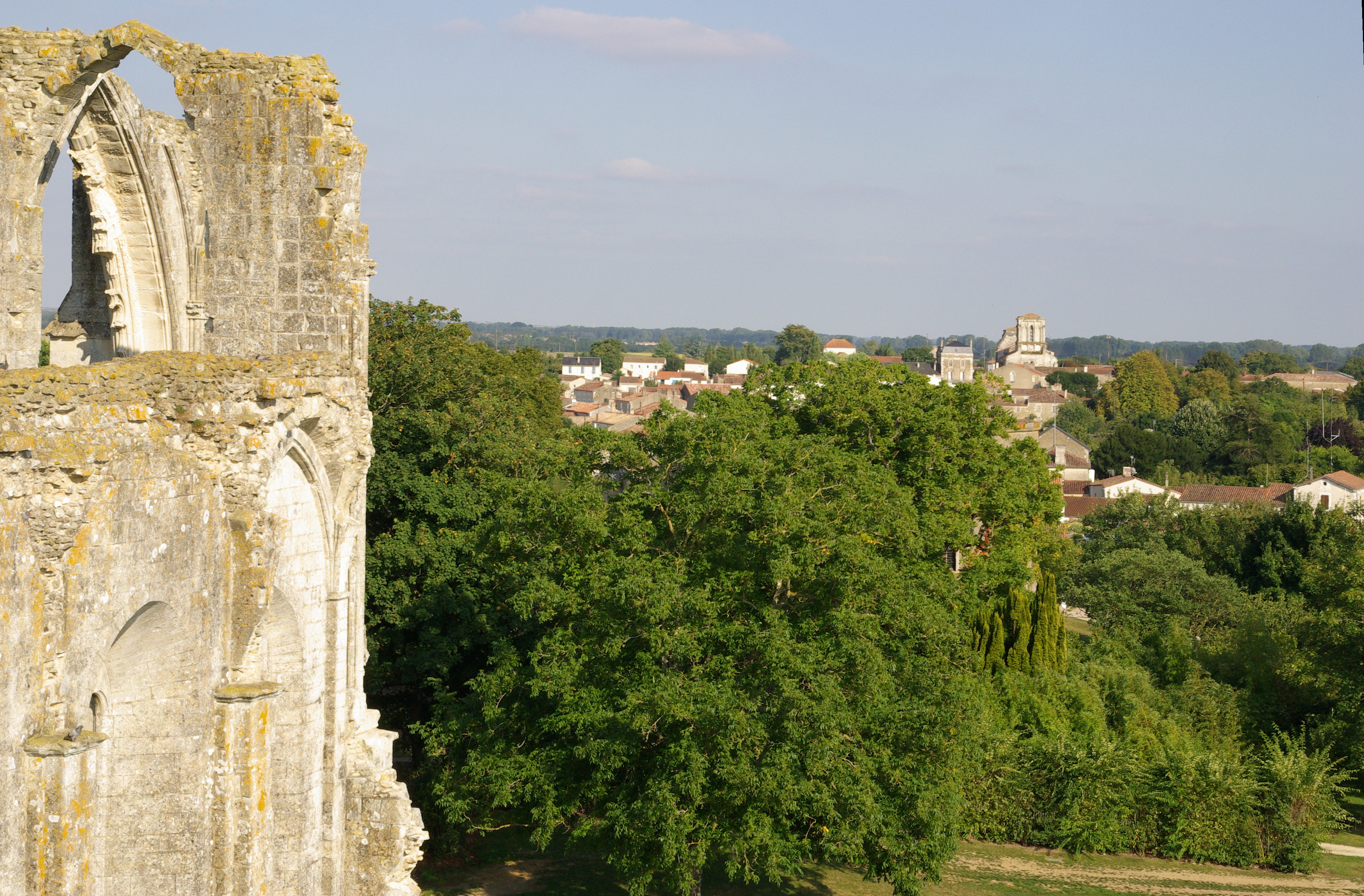
- Maillezais seen from the Abbey of Saint-Pierre

- Coat of arms
- Location of Maillezais
- Location within France Location within Pays de la Loire
- Coordinates: 46°22′20″N 0°44′17″W
- Country: France
- Region: Pays de la Loire
- Department: Vendée
- Arrondissement: Fontenay-le-Comte
- Canton: Fontenay-le-Comte
- Intercommunality: Vendée Sèvre Autise

Government
  - Mayor (2020–2026): Annie Rineau
- Area^{1}: 20.33 km^{2} (7.85 sq mi)
- Elevation: 7 m (23 ft)
- Highest elevation: 18 m (59 ft)
- Lowest elevation: 1 m (3.3 ft)
- Population (2023): 890
  - Density: 44/km^{2} (110/sq mi)
- Time zone: UTC+01:00 (CET)
  - Summer (DST): UTC+02:00 (CEST)
- INSEE/Postal code: 85133 /85420
- ^{1} French Land Register data, which excludes lakes, ponds, glaciers > 1 km^{2} (0.386 sq mi or 247 acres) and river estuaries.

Maillezais (French pronunciation: [majzɛ]) is a commune in the Vendée department in the Pays de la Loire region in western France.

It was once an island in the Marais Poitevin, until monks of the Maillezais Abbey dug canals in the 13th century. Remains of the sea wall are still present, and canoe tours of the canals are a regular attraction to tourists. The ruins of the former Maillezais Abbey, dating from the 11th-14th century, are a listed monument.

== See also ==
- Communes of the Vendée department
