= Saint-Anthème =

- Commune
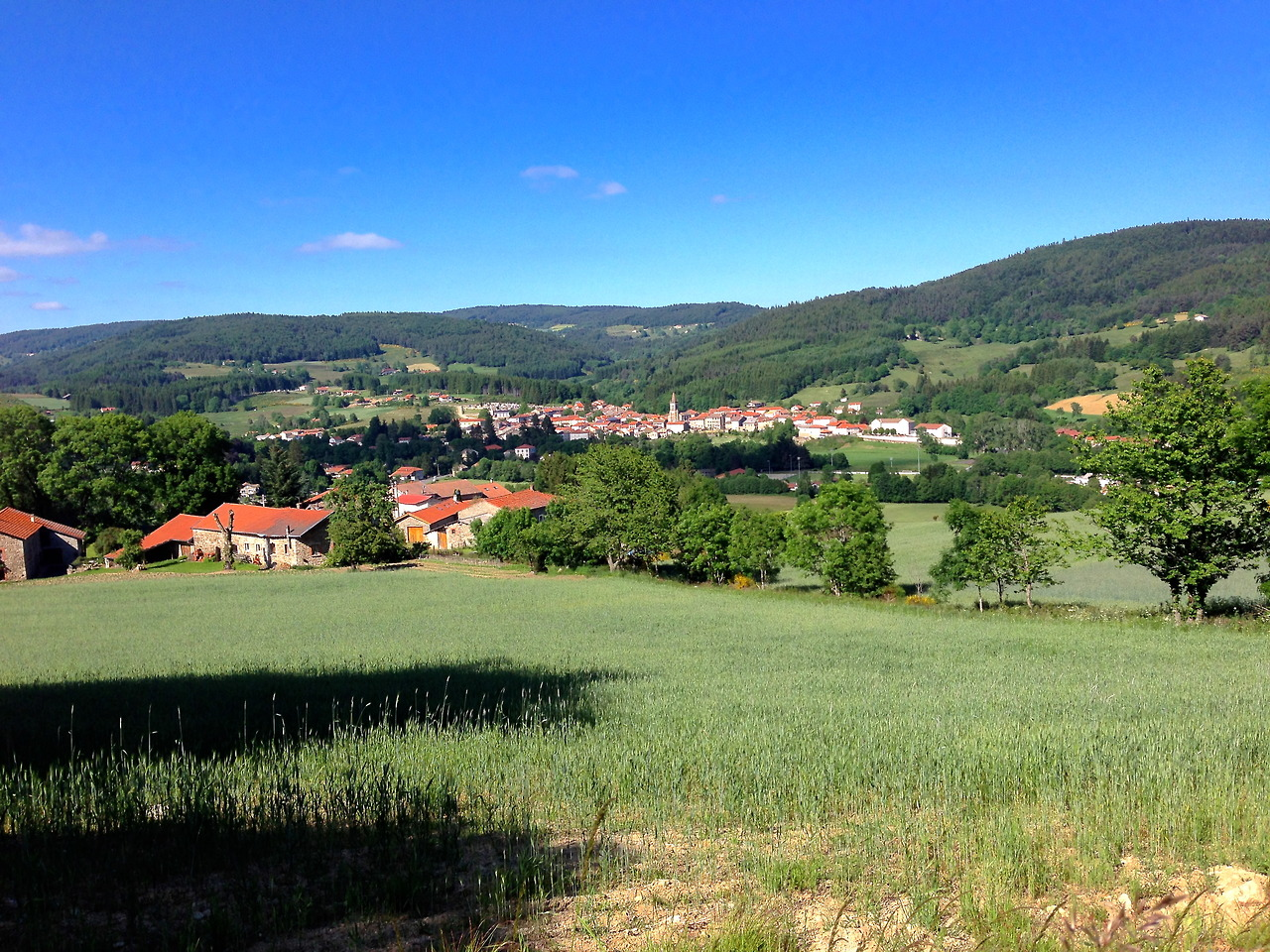
- A general view of Saint-Anthème

- Coat of arms
- Location of Saint-Anthème
- Location within France Location within Auvergne-Rhône-Alpes
- Coordinates: 45°31′41″N 3°55′05″E
- Country: France
- Region: Auvergne-Rhône-Alpes
- Department: Puy-de-Dôme
- Arrondissement: Ambert
- Canton: Ambert

Government
  - Mayor (2020–2026): Georges Morison
- Area^{1}: 68.89 km^{2} (26.60 sq mi)
- Elevation: 943 m (3,094 ft)
- Highest elevation: 1,423 m (4,669 ft)
- Lowest elevation: 906 m (2,972 ft)
- Population (2023): 716
  - Density: 10.4/km^{2} (26.9/sq mi)
- Time zone: UTC+01:00 (CET)
  - Summer (DST): UTC+02:00 (CEST)
- INSEE/Postal code: 63319 /63660
- ^{1} French Land Register data, which excludes lakes, ponds, glaciers > 1 km^{2} (0.386 sq mi or 247 acres) and river estuaries.

Saint-Anthème (French pronunciation: [sɛ̃.t‿ɑ̃tɛm]; Auvergnat: Sent Antèma) is a commune in the Puy-de-Dôme department in Auvergne in central France. The village is crossed by the river Ance, a left tributary of the Loire. Saint-Anthème has a lake and ski station for winter sports. A rich flora and fauna compose the natural park where Saint-Anthème stands.

== Climate ==
Climate data for Saint-Anthème, 1263m (1991−2020 normals, 1991−2024 extremes)
Month	Jan	Feb	Mar	Apr	May	Jun	Jul	Aug	Sep	Oct	Nov	Dec	Year
Record high °C (°F)	17.5 (63.5)	17.9 (64.2)	20.2 (68.4)	20.9 (69.6)	26.1 (79.0)	32.5 (90.5)	32.7 (90.9)	32.4 (90.3)	27.5 (81.5)	25.1 (77.2)	19.0 (66.2)	16.9 (62.4)	32.7 (90.9)
Mean daily maximum °C (°F)	2.5 (36.5)	2.9 (37.2)	6.3 (43.3)	9.3 (48.7)	13.4 (56.1)	17.4 (63.3)	19.7 (67.5)	19.7 (67.5)	15.3 (59.5)	11.3 (52.3)	5.9 (42.6)	3.3 (37.9)	10.6 (51.0)
Daily mean °C (°F)	−0.3 (31.5)	−0.2 (31.6)	2.6 (36.7)	5.3 (41.5)	9.2 (48.6)	12.9 (55.2)	15.0 (59.0)	15.1 (59.2)	11.3 (52.3)	7.9 (46.2)	3.0 (37.4)	0.5 (32.9)	6.9 (44.3)
Mean daily minimum °C (°F)	−3.2 (26.2)	−3.4 (25.9)	−1.1 (30.0)	1.3 (34.3)	4.9 (40.8)	8.4 (47.1)	10.3 (50.5)	10.5 (50.9)	7.2 (45.0)	4.4 (39.9)	0.2 (32.4)	−2.2 (28.0)	3.1 (37.6)
Record low °C (°F)	−15.8 (3.6)	−18.5 (−1.3)	−17.9 (−0.2)	−8.8 (16.2)	−4.6 (23.7)	−0.4 (31.3)	2.7 (36.9)	2.0 (35.6)	−1.4 (29.5)	−7.9 (17.8)	−15.9 (3.4)	−16.6 (2.1)	−18.5 (−1.3)
Average precipitation mm (inches)	103.2 (4.06)	89.5 (3.52)	87.7 (3.45)	116.5 (4.59)	132.2 (5.20)	114.0 (4.49)	114.4 (4.50)	110.0 (4.33)	104.6 (4.12)	120.8 (4.76)	138.5 (5.45)	115.1 (4.53)	1,346.5 (53)
Source: Meteociel

== See also ==
- Communes of the Puy-de-Dôme department
