= Paraza =

Commune in Occitanie, France

- Commune
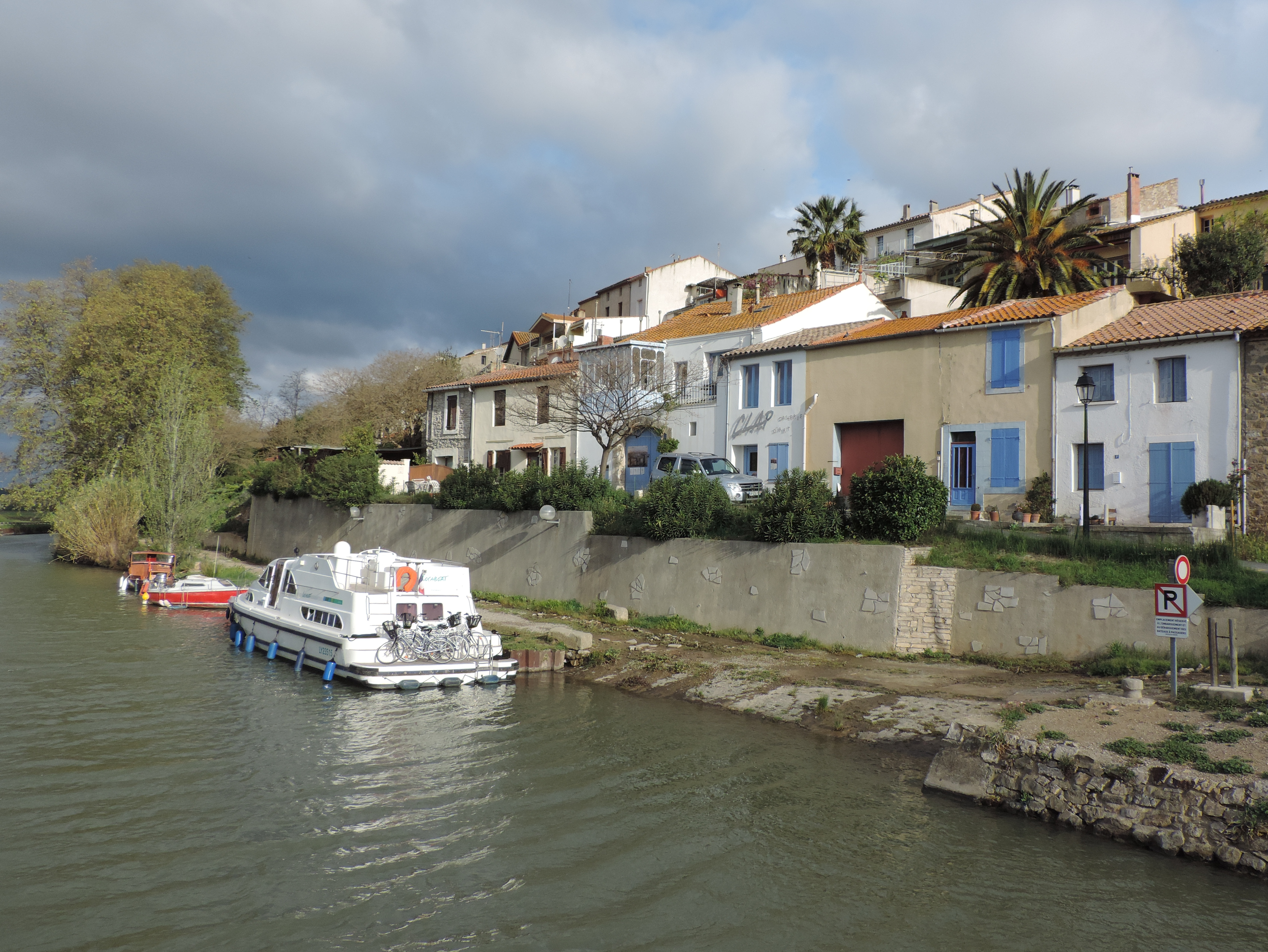
- The Canal du Midi in Paraza

- Coat of arms
- Location of Paraza
- Location within France Location within Occitanie
- Coordinates: 43°15′02″N 2°49′56″E
- Country: France
- Region: Occitania
- Department: Aude
- Arrondissement: Narbonne
- Canton: Le Sud-Minervois

Government
  - Mayor (2020–2026): Emile Delpy
- Area^{1}: 9.47 km^{2} (3.66 sq mi)
- Elevation: 34 m (112 ft)
- Highest elevation: 171 m (561 ft)
- Lowest elevation: 19 m (62 ft)
- Population (2023): 700
  - Density: 74/km^{2} (190/sq mi)
- Time zone: UTC+01:00 (CET)
  - Summer (DST): UTC+02:00 (CEST)
- INSEE/Postal code: 11273 /11200
- ^{1} French Land Register data, which excludes lakes, ponds, glaciers > 1 km^{2} (0.386 sq mi or 247 acres) and river estuaries.

Paraza (French pronunciation: [paʁaza]; Occitan: Parasan) is a commune in the Aude department in southern France.

== Population ==
Historical population
Year	Pop.	±% p.a.
1968	440	—
1975	410	−1.00%
1982	383	−0.97%
1990	401	+0.58%
1999	390	−0.31%
2007	573	+4.93%
2012	661	+2.90%
2017	622	−1.21%
2023	700	+1.99%
Source: INSEE

== See also ==
- Communes of the Aude department
