= Apostolic Vicariate of Iles Saint Pierre and Miquelon =

Former Catholic territory in French North America

Vicarate Apostolic of Iles Saint Pierre et Miquelon Vicariatus Apostolicus Insularum Sancti Petri et Miquelonensis Vicariat Apostolique des Îles Saint-Pierre-et-Miquelon

Location
- Country: Saint Pierre and Miquelon, France

Statistics
- Area: 242 km^{2} (93 sq mi)
- Population: Total; Catholics: (as of 2016); 6,250; 5,900 (94.4%)

Information
- Denomination: Catholic Church
- Sui iuris church: Latin Church
- Rite: Roman Rite
- Established: 1763
- Dissolved: March 1, 2018
- Cathedral: St. Pierre Cathedral, Saint-Pierre

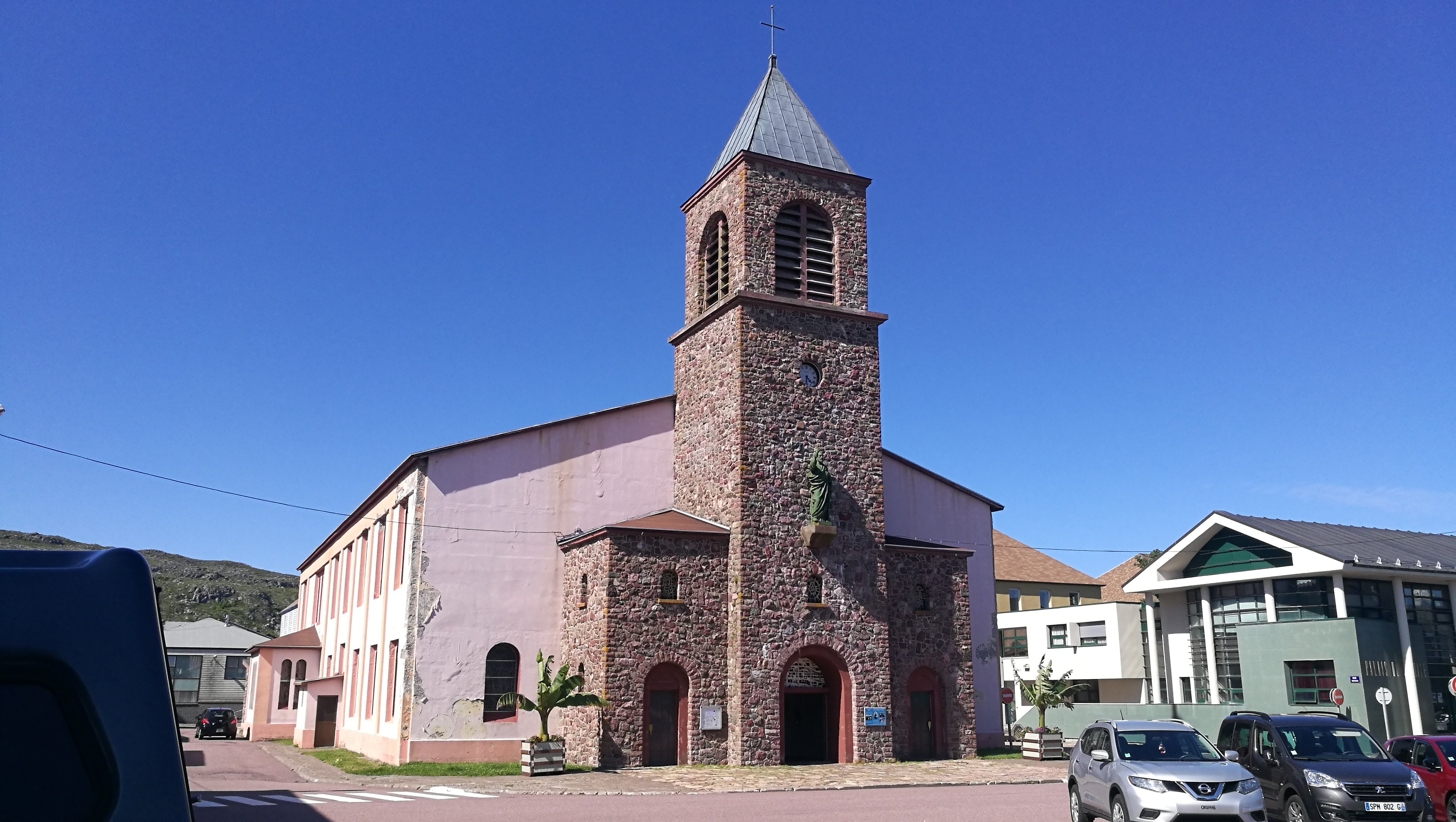
Cathédral Saint-Pierre in Saint-Pierre, Saint Pierre and Miquelon, 14 Aug 2019

The Vicariate Apostolic of Iles Saint Pierre et Miquelon (Latin: Vicariatus Apostolicus Insularum Sancti Petri et Miquelonensis; French: Vicariat Apostolique des Îles Saint-Pierre-et-Miquelon) was an apostolic vicariate of the Latin Church of the Catholic Church in North America. The vicariate comprised the entirety of the French dependency of Saint-Pierre and Miquelon off the south coast of Newfoundland. As an apostolic vicariate, it did not have a formal metropolitan. The church was headed by a vicar apostolic.

First erected as an apostolic prefecture, in 1763, after the fall of New France, it was established as an apostolic vicariate on November 16, 1970. At the moment of its merging with the Roman Catholic Diocese of La Rochelle and Saintes, the vicariate had two parishes with a combined community of 6,300 Catholics, served by two religious priests, six female religious, and two male religious.

On March 1, 2018, this vicariate was merged into the territory of the Roman Catholic Diocese of La Rochelle and Saintes, in the French département of Charente-Maritime.

== History ==
- 1763: Established as the Apostolic Prefecture of Iles Saint Pierre and Miquelon on territory of the Saint-Pierre and Miquelon from the Roman Catholic Diocese of Quebec.
- November 16, 1970: Promoted as the Apostolic Vicariate of Iles Saint Pierre and Miquelon.
- March 1, 2018: Officially suppressed and its territory merged into the Roman Catholic Diocese of La Rochelle and Saintes.

== Ordinaries ==
- Girard, C.S.Sp. † (22 Jan 1766 Appointed – 1767)
- Julien-François Becquet, C.S.Sp. † (28 Apr 1767 Appointed – 1775 Resigned)
- de Longueville † ( 1788 Appointed – 1793 Resigned)
- Ollivier † ( 1816 Appointed – 7 Sep 1842 Resigned)
- M. Le Helloco † (22 Jun 1853 Appointed – 1866 Resigned)
- M. Letournoux † (13 Dec 1866 Appointed – 1892 Resigned)
- Christophe-Louis Légasse † ( 1899 Appointed – 6 Dec 1915 Appointed, Bishop of Oran)
- Joseph Oster, C.S.Sp. † ( 1916 Appointed – 1922 Died)
- Charles Joseph Heitz † (9 Nov 1922 Appointed – 1933 Resigned)
- Raymond Henri Martin, C.S.Sp. † (23 Nov 1945 Appointed – 1966 )
- François Joseph Maurer, C.S.Sp. † (17 May 1966 Appointed – 17 Feb 2000 Retired)
- Lucien Prosper Ernest Fischer, C.S.Sp. (17 Feb 2000 Appointed – 19 Jun 2009 Retired)
- Marie Pierre François Auguste Gaschy, C.S.Sp. (19 Jun 2009 Appointed – 1 Mar 2018 Retired)
