= Diocese of La Rochelle and Saintes =

Catholic diocese in France

Coordinates: 46°09′22″N 1°09′20″W

Diocese of La Rochelle and Saintes Dioecesis Rupellensis et Santonensis Diocèse de La Rochelle et Saintes

Catholic
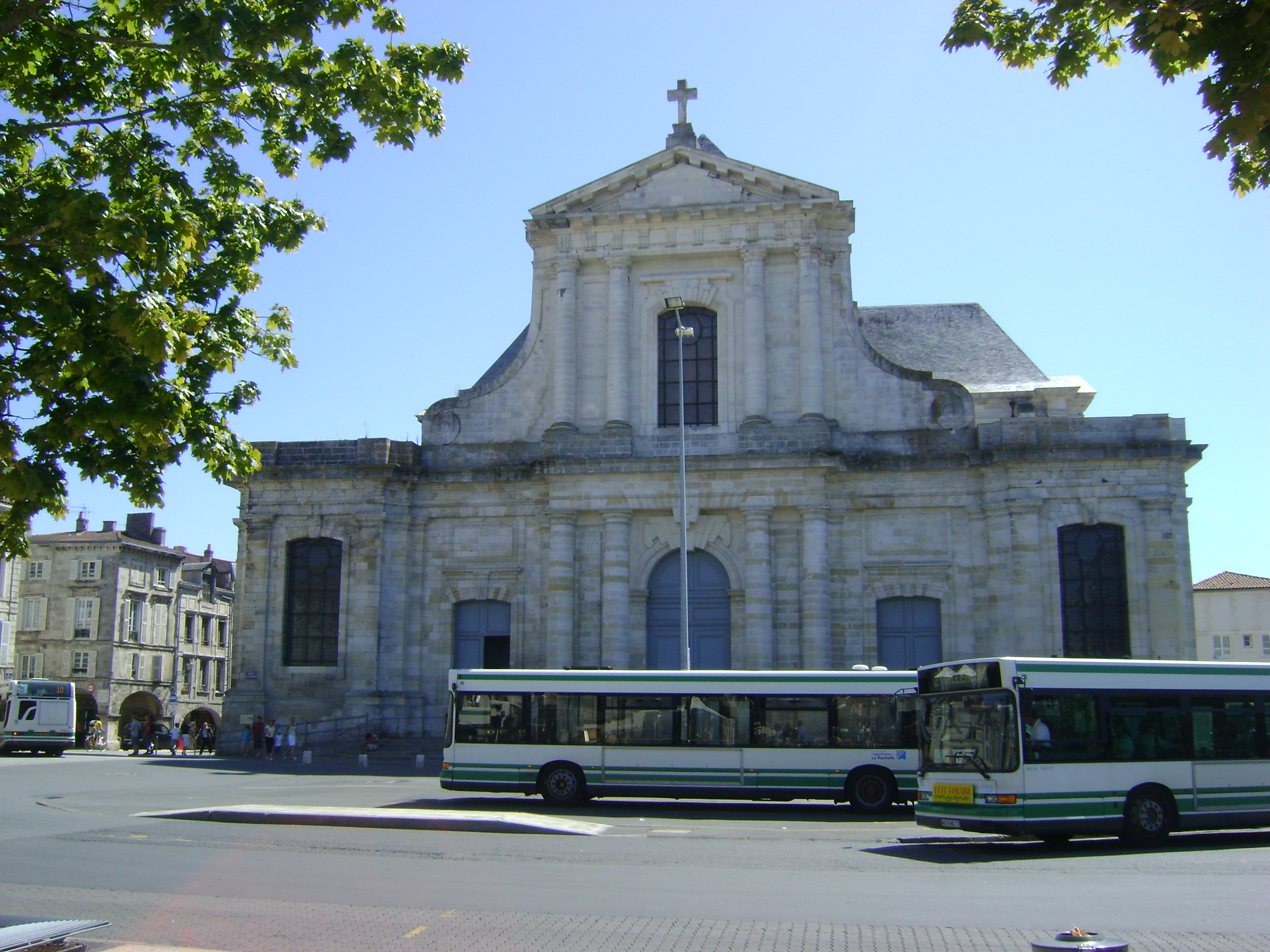
- Cathédrale Saint-Louis, La Rochelle

Location
- Country: France
- Ecclesiastical province: Poitiers
- Metropolitan: Archdiocese of Poitiers

Statistics
- Area: 6,863 km^{2} (2,650 sq mi)
- Population: Total; Catholics: (as of 2021); 648,199; 400,000 (61.7%)
- Parishes: 47

Information
- Denomination: Roman Catholic
- Sui iuris church: Latin Church
- Rite: Roman Rite
- Established: 4 May 1648 (La Rochelle); 22 January 1852 (La Rochelle and Saintes)
- Cathedral: La Rochelle Cathedral
- Co-cathedral: Saintes Cathedral
- Patron saint: St. Eutropius of Saintes
- Secular priests: 81 (Diocesan); 17 (Religious Orders); 34 Permanent Deacons

Current leadership
- Pope: Leo XIV
- Bishop: Georges Colomb
- Metropolitan Archbishop: Pascal Wintzer
- Coadjutor: Pierre-Antoine Bozo
- Apostolic Administrator: François Jacolin

Map

Website
- Website of the Diocese

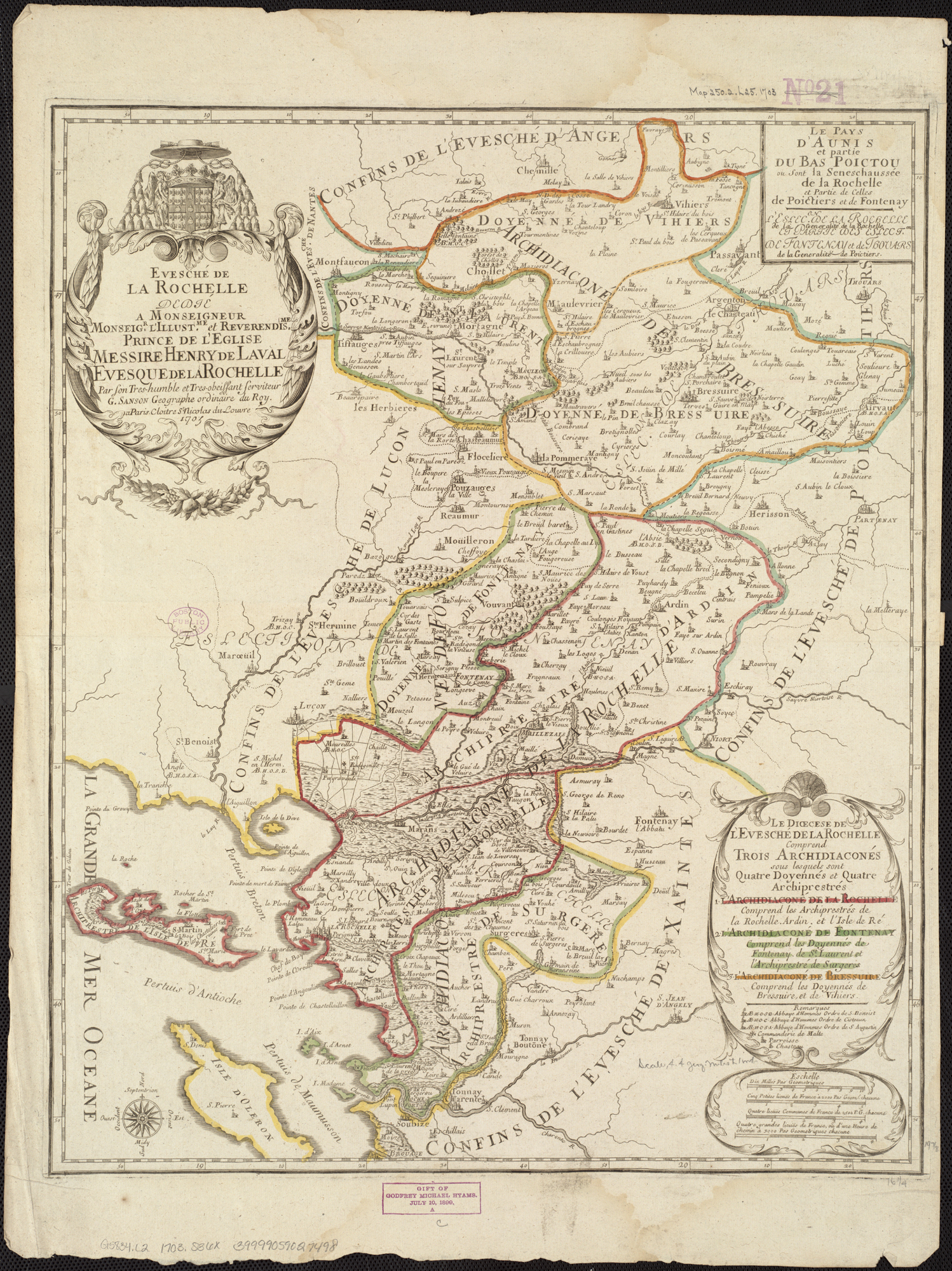
Map of Diocese of La Rochelle (1703)

The Diocese of La Rochelle and Saintes (Latin: Dioecesis Rupellensis et Santonensis; French: Diocèse de La Rochelle et Saintes) is a Latin Church diocese of the Catholic Church in France. The diocese comprises the département of Charente-Maritime and the French overseas collectivity of Saint-Pierre and Miquelon. The bishop is a suffragan of the Archbishop of Poitiers. The episcopal seat is in La Rochelle Cathedral. Saintes Cathedral is a co-cathedral.

As of 2021, the diocese had one priest for every 4,081 Catholics.

== History ==
The Diocese of La Rochelle was erected on 4 May 1648. The Diocese of Maillezais was transferred on 7 May 1648 to La Rochelle. This diocese before the French Revolution, aside from Maillezais, included the present arrondissements of Marennes, Rochefort, La Rochelle, and a part of Saint-Jean-d'Angély.

During the French Revolution, the Diocese of Saintes and the Diocese of La Rochelle were combined into the Diocese of Charente-Inferieure, under the direction of a Constitutional Bishop, salaried by and responsible to the French Republic. There was a schism with Rome and the Pope. On 15 July 1801, Pope Pius VII signed a new Concordat with First Consul Napoleon Bonaparte, who had overthrown the Directorate in the Coup of 18 Brumaire (9 November 1799); the terms included the suppression of the Dioceses of Saintes and Luçon, which was carried out on 29 November 1801. The entire territory of the former Diocese of Saintes, except for the part in Charente belonging to the Diocese of Angoulême, and the entire Diocese of Luçon, were added to the Diocese of La Rochelle.

In 1821, a see was again established at Luçon, and had under its jurisdiction, aside from the former Diocese of Luçon, almost the entire former Diocese of Maillezais; so that Maillezais, once transferred to La Rochelle, no longer belongs to the diocese, now known as La Rochelle et Saintes.

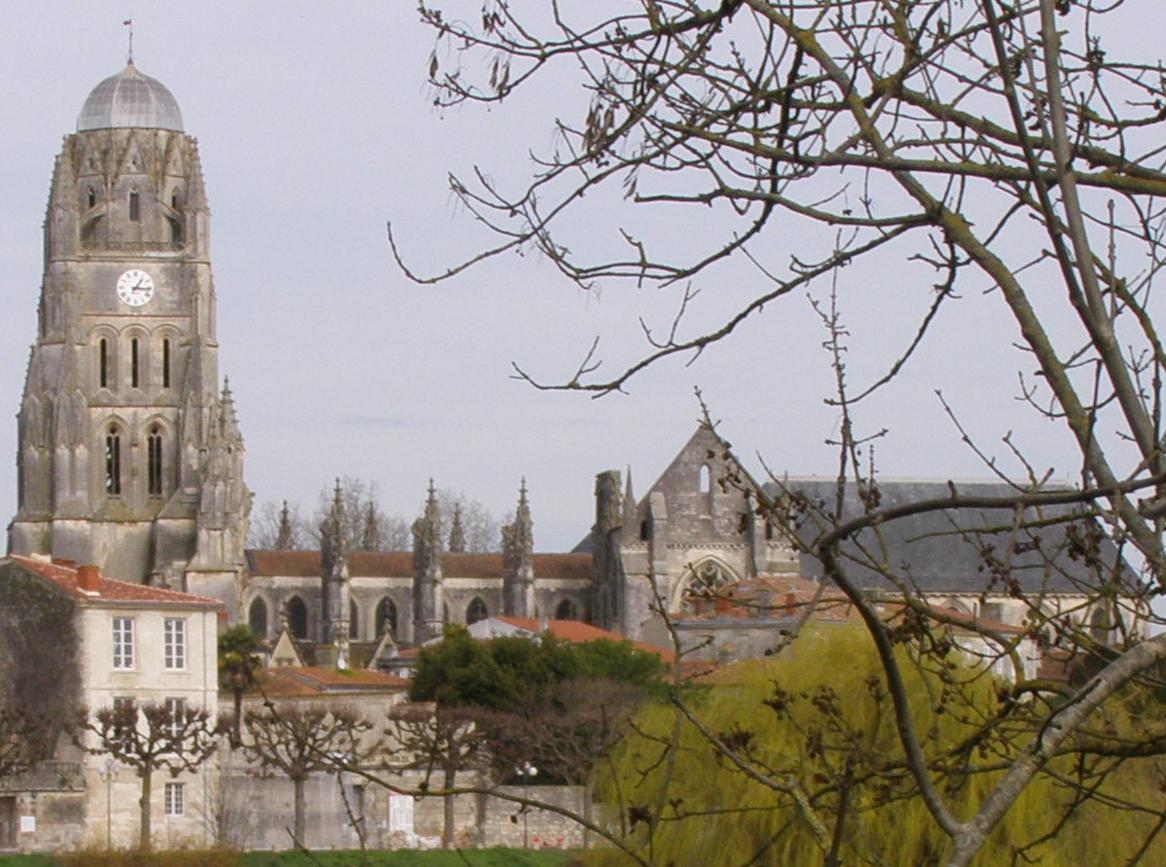
Saintes Cathedral is the Co-Cathedral of the diocese

St. Louis of France is the titular saint of the cathedral of La Rochelle and the patron of the city. St. Eutropius, first Bishop of Saintes, is the principal patron of the present diocese of La Rochelle. In this diocese are especially honoured: St. Gemme, martyr (century unknown); St. Seronius, martyr (third century); St. Martin, Abbot of the Saintes monastery (fifth century); St. Vaise, martyr about 500; St. Maclovius (Malo), first Bishop of Aleth, Brittany, who died in Saintonge about 570; Saint Amand, Bishop of Maastricht (seventh century).

From 1534, La Rochelle and the Province of Aunis were a centre of Calvinism. In 1573 the city successfully resisted the Duke of Anjou, brother of Charles IX of France, and remained the chief fortress of the Huguenots in France. In 1627, however, the alliance of La Rochelle with the English proved to Louis XIII and Cardinal Richelieu that the political independence of the Protestants would be a menace to France; the famous siege of La Rochelle (5 August 1627 – 28 October 1628), in the course of which the population was reduced from 18,000 inhabitants to 5000, terminated with a capitulation which put an end to the political claims of the Calvinistic minority.

The Chapter of the Cathedral of Saint-Louis was composed of eight dignitaries and twenty Canons. The dignitaries were the Dean (elected by the Chapter), the Treasurer, the Almoner, the Grand Archdeacon, the Archdeacon of Fontenay, the Cantor, the Subcantor and the Archdeacon of Bressuire—all appointed by the bishop. A seminary was established by royal order, with an income of 3000 livres, derived from an assessment on all of the benefices in the diocese. The seminary was entrusted to the Jesuits in 1694 by Bishop de la Frezelière, two of whose brothers were Jesuits.

During the French Revolution, when the Civil Constitution of the Clergy instituted a national church, and the nation was redivided into dioceses which matched as far as possible the civil departments into which the administration of the state was divided, the diocese of Saintes and the diocese of La Rochelle were combined into the Diocese of Charente-Inferieure. Both Bishop de La Rochefoucauld and Bishop de Coucy refused to take the oath of loyalty to the Civil Constitution, as required by law. They were therefore deposed. The electors of Charente-Infeurieure assembled on 27 February 1791 and elected Isaac-Étienne Robinet, the curé of Saint-Savinien-du-Port as their Constitutional Bishop. He made his formal entry into Saintes on 31 March, and took formal possession of the cathedral on 10 April. He roused up the anti-clerical feelings of the populace against the non-jurors, but, once roused, they turned against all the clergy, including Robinet. Bishop Robinet resigned on 6 December 1793, and took up residence with his brother at Torxé, where he died on 8 September 1797.

On 1 March 2018, the Apostolic Vicariate of Iles Saint-Pierre et Miquelon, which had existed since 1763, was suppressed and the French overseas collectivity Saint-Pierre and Miquelon added to this Diocese.

== Bishops ==
- 1648–1661 Jacques Raoul de la Guibourgère
- 1661–1693 Henri de Laval de Boisdauphin
- 1693–1702 Charles-Madeleine Frézeau de Frézelière
- 1702–1724 Etienne de Champflour
- 1725–1729 Jean-Antoine de Brancas (later Archbishop of Aix)
- 1730–1767 Augustin Roch de Menou de Charnisai
- 1768–1789 François-Emmanuel de Crussol d'Uzès
- 1789–1801 (1816) Jean-Charles de Coucy
  - 1791–1793 Isaac-Étienne Robinet (Constitutional Bishop)
- 9 April – 20 November 1802 Michel-François Couët du Vivier de Lorry
- 1802–1804 Jean-François Demandolx (transferred to Amiens)
- 1804–1826 Gabriel-Laurent Paillou(x)
- 1827–1835 Joseph Bernet (subsequently archbishop of Aix)
- 1835–1856 Clément Villecourt (named a Cardinal in 1855)
- 1856–1866 Jean-François Landriot (transferred to Reims)
- 1867–1883 Léon-Benoît-Charles Thomas (subsequently archbishop of Rouen)
- 1884–1892 Etienne Ardin (subsequently archbishop of Sens)
- 1892–1901 François-Joseph-Edwin Bonnefoy (subsequently archbishop of Aix)
- 1901–1906 Emile-Paul-Angel-Constant Le Camus
- 1906–1923 Jean-Auguste-François-Eutrope Eyssautier
- 1923–1937 Eugène Curien
- 1938–1955 Louis Liagre
- 1955–1963 Xavier Morilleau
- 1963–1979 Félix-Marie-Honoré Verdet
- 1979–1983 François-Marie-Christian Favreau
- 1985–1996 Jacques Louis Antoine Marie David
- 1996–2006 Georges Paul Pontier (also archbishop of Marseille)
- 2006–2016 Bernard Housset
- 2016–Present Georges Colomb

== Churches ==
- Saint Catherine Church of Loix

== See also ==
- Catholic Church in France

== Bibliography ==
=== References ===
- Gauchat, Patritius (Patrice) (1935). Hierarchia catholica IV (1592-1667). Münster: Libraria Regensbergiana. p. 298. (in Latin)
- Ritzler, Remigius; Sefrin, Pirminus (1952). Hierarchia catholica medii et recentis aevi V (1667-1730). Patavii: Messagero di S. Antonio. p. 337.
- Ritzler, Remigius; Sefrin, Pirminus (1958). Hierarchia catholica medii et recentis aevi VI (1730-1799). Patavii: Messagero di S. Antonio. p. 360.

=== Studies ===
- Bochert de Saron, Jean Jacques; Étienne de Champflour; Cardinal Louis Antoine de Noailles (1711). L'Intrigue découverte, ou Réflexions sur la lettre de M. l'abbé Bochart de Saron à M. l'évêque de Clermont, & sur un modéle de lettre au Roi. Avec quelques pièces concernant le différent d'entre M. le Cardinal de Noailles ...&les évêques du Luçon & de la Rochelle (in French).
- Cholet, Paul-François-Etienne (1862). Notice historique sur la Cathédrale de la Rochelle (in French). La Rochelle: J. Deslandes.
- Jean, Armand (1891). Les évêques et les archevêques de France depuis 1682 jusqu'à 1801 (in French). Paris: A. Picard. pp. 147–152.
- Pérouas, Louis (1964). Le diocèse de La Rochelle de 1648 à 1724. Sociologie et Pastorale. Paris.
- Relation du différend entre M. le cardinal de Noailles, archevêque de Paris, et Messieurs les évêques de Luçon [J. F. de l'Escure de Valderil] et de La Rochelle [Etienne Champflour], et de Gap [F. Berger de Malissolles] (in French). 1712.
- Riou, Yves-Jean (1985). La cathédrale Saint-Louis de LaRochelle. Inventaire général des monuments et des richesses artistiques de la France. Commission régionale de Poitou-Charentes (in French). Poitiers: Secrétariat régional de l'Inventaire général. ISBN 978-2-905764-00-3.
- Sévestre, Émile (1905). L'histoire, le texte et la destinée du Concordat de 1801. Paris: Lethielleux.
