= La Rochelle Cathedral =

Catholic church in France

Coordinates: 46°9′41″N 1°9′12″W

La Rochelle Cathedral Cathédrale Saint-Louis de la Rochelle
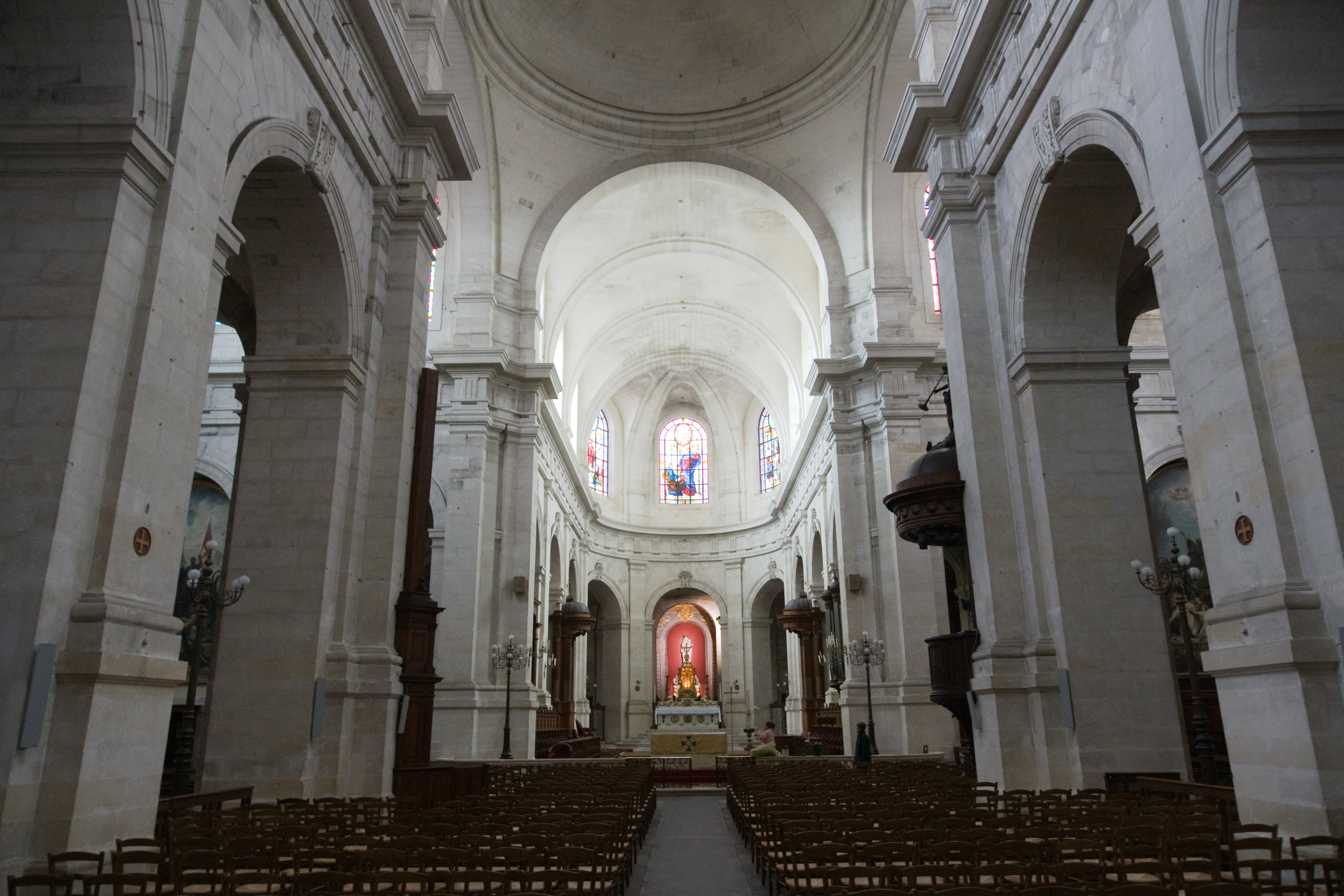
- La Rochelle Cathedral

Religion
- Affiliation: Roman Catholic Church
- Diocese: Diocese of La Rochelle and Saintes
- Rite: Roman
- Ecclesiastical or organizational status: Cathedral

Location
- Location: La Rochelle, France
- Interactive map of La Rochelle Cathedral; Cathédrale Saint-Louis de la Rochelle

Architecture
- Type: church
- Style: Classical
- Groundbreaking: 1742
- Completed: 19th century

La Rochelle Cathedral (French: Cathédrale Saint-Louis de la Rochelle) is a Catholic church located in the city of La Rochelle, France. The cathedral has been a national monument since 1906.

== Present cathedral ==
The Diocese of La Rochelle (Diocese of La Rochelle and Saintes from 1852) was created in 1648 but the first stone of the new cathedral was not laid until 1742, by which time the architect who drew up the plans, Jacques Gabriel, was dead; the work was supervised, from a distance, by his son Ange-Jacques Gabriel. Although still not complete, it was consecrated anyway in 1784. The structure is a rather bare Neo-Classical one. The cupola has paintings by William Bouguereau, a native of the city.

== St. Barthélémy ==
Attached to the chevet of the present cathedral is the late medieval Gothic bell tower of the Church of St. Barthélémy (Saint Bartholomew), first constructed in 1152 by monks from the Ile d'Aix, the rest of which was destroyed by the Huguenots in 1568. The tower, on one of the highest points of La Rochelle, was used as a gun tower against the besieging army of Louis XIII in 1627.

The displaced parishioners were able in 1628 to take over as their church the grand temple, a former Protestant church adjacent to the site of the medieval St. Barthélémy, only to find in 1648, on the creation of the Diocese of La Rochelle, that the new chapter wished to use it as the cathedral. The parishioners therefore built a new church of St. Barthélémy nearby, which was completed in 1678. The older church however burnt down in 1687 and the chapter moved into the new church, which they and the parish were obliged to share until the consecration of the new cathedral in 1784. The church was entirely destroyed during the French Revolution and the site re-developed with houses, which were demolished later in the 19th century when it was possible to finish the cathedral.
