= Diocese of Soissons =

Catholic diocese in France

Coordinates: 49.38°N 3.32°E

Diocese of Soissons, Laon, and Saint-Quentin Dioecesis Suessionensis, Laudunensis et Sanquintinensis Diocèse de Soissons, Laon et Saint-Quentin

Catholic
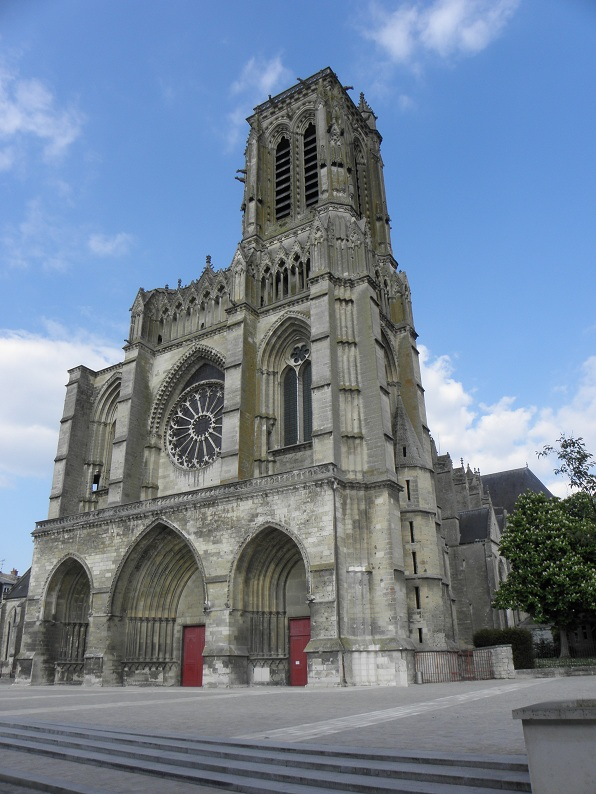
- Soissons Cathedral

Location
- Country: France
- Ecclesiastical province: Reims
- Metropolitan: Archdiocese of Reims

Statistics
- Area: 7,378 km^{2} (2,849 sq mi)
- Population: Total; Catholics: (as of 2022); 536,136 ▲ (est.); 386,000 ▲ (est.) (72%)
- Parishes: 41

Information
- Denomination: Roman Catholic
- Sui iuris church: Latin Church
- Rite: Roman Rite
- Established: 3rd Century (Soissons); 1828 (Soissons and Laon); 1901 (Soissons, Laon and Saint-Quentin)
- Cathedral: Cathedral Basilica of St. Gervase and St. Protais in Soissons
- Patron saint: St. Gervasius and St. Protasius
- Secular priests: 53 (Diocesan); 16 ▼ (Religious Orders); 25 Permanent Deacons

Current leadership
- Pope: Leo XIV
- Bishop: Martial Bernard
- Metropolitan Archbishop: Éric de Moulins-Beaufort

Map

Website
- Website of the Diocese

The Diocese of Soissons, Laon, and Saint-Quentin (Latin: Dioecesis Suessionensis, Laudunensis et Sanquintinensis; French: Diocèse de Soissons, Laon et Saint-Quentin) is a Latin Church diocese of the Catholic Church in France. The diocese is suffragan to the Archdiocese of Reims and corresponds, with the exception of two hamlets, to the entire Department of Aisne. The current bishop is Renauld Marie François Dupont de Dinechin, appointed on 30 October 2015. In 2022, in the Diocese of Soissons there is one priest for every 5,594 Catholics.

== History ==
Traditions make St. Sixtus and St. Sinicius the earliest apostles of Soissons as envoys of St. Peter. In the 280's the Caesar Maximian, the subordinate of the Emperor Diocletian, and his Praetorian Prefect Riccius Varus campaigned in northeast Gaul and subdued the Bagaudae, an event accompanied by much slaughter. There were also executions of Christians from Trier to Reims. St. Crepinus and St. Crepinianus, martyrs (c. 288), are patrons of the diocese. According to Louis Duchesne, the establishment of a see at Soissons dates from about 300.

Soissons played an important political role in the early history of the Merovingians. It was the capital of the Kingdom of Soissons, a remnant of the Roman Empire in northern Gaul, and remained one of the chief cities under King Clovis I. Subsequently, Soissons twice became the capital of one of the four kingdoms into which the Frankish kingdom was divided in 511 (under Chlothar I) and 561 (und Chilperic I, respectively.

The Bishop of Soissons was a senior suffragan of Reims with the privilege of replacing the archbishop at the ceremony of anointing a King of France, should the see of Reims be vacant. The Bishop of Laon ranked as Duke and peer from the twelfth century. As second ecclesiastical peer, he had the privilege of holding the ampulla during the anointing of the king.

During the arrest and trials of the Knights Templar in the fourteenth century, several knights came from different dioceses to answer against the charge of heresy. Guillaume de Roy, from the Diocese of Soissons, was one of the Templars who defended the Order.

The diocese of Soisson was re-established by the Concordat of 1802 as suffragan of Paris, but in 1821 it became suffragan of Reims. After an attempts to re-establish the See of Laon failed with the unexecuted Concordat of 11 June 1817, the bishop of Soissons was authorized by Pope Leo XII (13 June 1828) to join the title of Laon to that of his own see. Pope Leo XIII (11 June 1901) further authorized it to use the title of St-Quentin, which was formerly the residence of the bishop of Noyon.

The diocese consists of

- all the ancient Diocese of Soissons, except the civil district of Compiègne, which went to the Diocese of Beauvais
- all of the Diocese of Laon, except two parishes, which went to Reims
- that portion of Vermandois which formerly belonged to the Diocese of Noyon
- a few parishes which formerly belonged to Cambrai, Meaux, Troyes, Reims.

== See of Laon ==
The "See of Laon" refers to the diocese of Laon, which was established by St. Remigius and made a "uterine sister" of Reims through an endowment from its lands 1 . The term "see" refers to the jurisdictional area of a bishop, and the "See of Laon" would have been the area over which the bishop of Laon had authority.

The diocese of Laon in the present-day département of Aisne, was a Catholic diocese for around 1300 years, up to the French Revolution. Its seat was in Laon, France, with the Laon Cathedral. From early in the 13th century, the bishop of Laon was a Pair de France, among the elite.

== Bishops of Soissons ==
=== To 1000 ===
- Sixtus of Reims
- St Sinicus (ca. 300 – 310)
- St. Divitianus (ca. 310 – 320)
- Rufinus
- Filienus
- Mercurius (ca. 347)
- Onesimus (c. 350–361)
- Vincent
- Luberan
- Onesimus II.
- Edibius (c. 431–62); St Edibus (c. 451)
- Principius (462–505), brother of St. Remy of Reims.
- Lupus (505–35);
- Baldarinus (Baudry) (535 – 545)
- Anectarius († 573)
- Thibaut I.
- Droctigisilus († c. 589)
- Tondulphus
- Landulphus
- St. Ansericus or Anscher (623–52); St Ansery († c. 652)
- Bettolenus
- St. Drausinus (657–676),
- Warembert
- St. Adolbertus (677–85); St Adalbert
- S. Gaudinus (685–707),
- Macarius
- Galcoin
- Gobald
- Hubert (Gerarbert)
- Maldabert
- Deodatus I.
- Hildegodus (Hildegondus (c. 765)
- Rothadus (814–831)
- Rothadus (832–869)
- [Engelmond (863–864)]
- Hildebold (Hildebaud) (870–884)
- Riculfus (Riculf) (884–902)
- Rodoin († c. 909)
- Abbo (Chancellor of France 922–931, † 937)
- Guido of Anjou († 973)
- Guido of Amiens († 995)

=== 1000–1500 ===
- Fulco († 6 August 1019)
- Deodatus II (1019 – 1020)
- Beroldus († 1052)
- Heddo († 1064)
- Adelard († 1072)
- Thibaut de Pierrefonds († 1080)
- Ursion (1080, deposed)
- St. Arnuel de Paméle (1081–1082)
- Ingelram
- Hilgot (c. 1084 – 1087)
- Henry of Poitou (1088–1090)
- Hugues de Pierrefonds (1091 – 30 January 1103)
- Manasses of Soissons (1103 – 1 March 1108)
- Liziard de Crépy (1108-† c.1126)
- Jocelyn de Vierzy (1126 – 24 October 1152)
- Ansculfe de Pierrefonds (1152–1158)
- Hugues de Champfleury (1159–75), chancellor of Louis VII of France; [(1158–1175) (Chancellor of France 1150–1172)
- Nivelon de Quierzy (1175–1207)
- Aymard de Provins (July 1208 – 20 May 1219)
- Jacques de Bazoches (July 1219 – 8 July 1242)
- Raoul de Couduno (by 1244 – 6 December 1245)
- Gui de Château Porcein (1245 – 1250)
- Nivelon de Bazoches (1252 – 10 February 1262)
- Milon de Bazoches (1262 – 24 September 1290)
- Gérard de Montcornet (23 March 1292 – 1 September 1296)
- Guy de La Charité (30 July 1296 – 8 July 1313)
- Gérard de Courtonne (27 August 1313 – 27 October 1331)
- Pierre de Chappes (13 November 1331 – September 1349)
- Guillaume Bertrand de Colombier (31 October 1349 – 15 May 1362)
- Simon de Bucy (10 June 1362 – 14 October 1404)
- Victor de Camerin (20 October 1404 – 13 January 1414)
- Nicolas Graibert (11 February 1414 – November 1442)
- Renaud de Fontaines (8 January 1423 – 1442)
- Jean Milet (15 February 1443 – 1 April 1503)

=== 1500–1790 ===
- Claude de Louvain (24 April 1503 – 18 August 1514)
- Foucault de Bonneval (1514–1519)
- Symphorien de Bullioud (1519–1532)
- Mathieu de Longuejoue (1533–1557)
- Charles de Roucy (1557 – 1585)
- Jérôme Hennequin (1585 – 1619)
- Charles de Hacqueville (1619 – 1623)
- Simon Legras (1623 – 1656)
- Charles de Bourlon (28 October 1656 – 26 October 1685)
- Pierre Daniel Huet (1685–1689) (not installed)
- Fabio Brûlart de Sillery (21 January 1692 – 20 November 1714)
- Jean-Joseph Languet de Gergy (1715 – 1731)
- Charles-François Lefévre de Laubrière (17 December 1731 – 25 December 1738)
- François de Fitz-James (1739 – 1764)
- Henri Joseph Claude de Bourdeille (17 December 1764 – 1801)

=== From 1800 ===
- Jean-Claude Le Blanc de Beaulieu (1802 – 1820)
- Guillaume Aubin de Villèle (28 August 1820 – 1824)
- Jules François de Simony (1824–1847, † 1849)
- Paul-Armand de Cardon de Garsignies (1847–1860)
- Jean-Joseph Christophe (1860–1863)
- Jean Dours (1863–1876, † 1877)
- Odon Thibaudier (1876–1889) (later Bishop of Cambrai 1889, † 1892)
- Jean-Baptiste Théodore Duval (1889–1897)
- Augustin Victor Deramecourt (1898–1906)
- Pierre Louis Péchenard (1906–1920)
- Charles-Henri-Joseph Binet (1920–1927) (later Archbishop of Besançon 1927, † 1936)
- Ernest Victor Mennechet, 1928–1946
- Pierre Auguste Marie Joseph Douillard (1946–1963)
- Alphonse Gérard Bannwarth (1963–1984)
- Daniel Labille (1984–1998) (later Bishop of Créteil)
- Marcel Paul Herriot (1999–2008)
- Hervé Giraud (2008–2015)
- Renauld de Dinechin (2015–2025)
- Martial Bernard (since 2026)

== Abbeys ==
Diocese of Soissons

The Abbey of St-Médard at Soissons, founded in 557 by Clotaire I to receive the body of St. Médard, was looked upon as the chief Benedictine abbey in France; it held more than two hundred and twenty fiefs. Hilduin, abbot (822–30), in 826 obtained from Pope Eugene II relics of St. Sebastian and St. Gregory the Great; he caused the relics of St. Godard and St. Remi to be transferred to the abbey; he rebuilt the church which was consecrated 27 August 841, in the presence of Charles the Bald and seventy-two prelates. The king bore the body of St. Médard into the new basilica. In 853 Charles the Bald presided over the Council of Soissons at Saint-Medard, in the company of fifty-one bishops. Bishop Rothadus of Soissons was deposed, due to the malevolence of Archbishop Hincmar of Reims, but restored on orders of Pope Nicholas I.

The church was pulled down but rebuilt and reconsecrated in 1131 by Pope Innocent II, who granted those visiting the church indulgences known as "St. Médard's pardons". In this abbey Louis the Pious was imprisoned in 833, and there he underwent a public penance. Among the abbots of St. Médard's are: St. Arnoul, who in 1081 became Bishop of Soissons; St. Gerard (close of the eleventh century); Cardinal de Bernis, made commendatory abbot of St. Médard in 1756.

The Benedictine Abbey of Note Dame de Soissons was founded in 660 by Ebroin and his wife Leutrude. The Cistercian abbey of Longpont, founded in 1131, counted among its monks the theologian Pierre Cantor, who died in 1197, and Blessed John de Montmirail (1167–1217), who abandoned the court of Phillipe-Auguste in order to become a monk.

The abbey of St. Vincent at Laon was founded in 580 by Queen Brunehaut. Among its earlier monks were: St. Gobain, who, through love of solitude, retired to a desert place near Oise and was slain there; St. Chagnoaldus, afterward Bishop of Laon, who wished to die in his monastery; St. Humbert, first abbot of Maroilles in Hainaut. The abbey adopted the rule of St. Benedict. It was reformed in 961 by Blessed Malcaleine, a Scotchman, abbot of St. Michael at Thierache, and in 1643 by the Benedictines of St. Maur. Among the abbots of St. Vincent were: St. Gerard (close of the eleventh century), who wrote the history of St. Adelard, abbot of Corde; Jean de Nouelles (d. 1396), who wrote a history of the world, and began the cartulary of his monastery. The Abbey of St. John at Laon was founded in 650 by St. Salaberga, who built seven churches there; she was its first abbess; St. Austruda (d. 688) succeeded her. In 1128 the abbey became a Benedictine monastery. The Abbey of Nogent sous Coucy was founded in 1076 by Albéric, Lord of Coucy. Among its abbots were St. Geoffroy (end of the eleventh century) and the historian Guibert de Nogent, who died in 1112 and whose autobiography, "De Vita Sua" is one of the most interesting documents of the century. Under the title "Gesta Dei per Francos" he wrote an account of the First Crusade.

The Abbey of Cuissy in the Diocese of Laon was founded in 1116 by Blessed Lucas de Roucy, dean of Laon, and followed the rule of Premonstratensians. In the Diocese of Soissons, the Premonstratensians had the abbeys: Chartreuve, Valsery, Saint-Yved de Braine, Villers Cotterets, Val Secret, Vauchrétien, Lieurestauré.

The portion of the ancient Diocese of Noyon within the jurisdiction of the present Diocese of Soissons includes the town, St-Quentin (Augusta Vermanduorum) where St-Quentin was martyred under Diocletian. It was the chief town of a diocese until 532, when St. Médard, the titular, removed the see to Noyon. Abbott Fulrade built the Church of St-Quentin in the eighth century and Pope Stephan II blessed it (816). From the time of Charles Martel until 771, and again from 844 the abbots of St-Quentin were laymen and counts of Vermandois. The abbey church became the Saint-Quentin Basilica, built from the 12th to 15th centuries. During the Middle Ages a distinct type of religious architecture sprang up in Soissons; Eugéne Lefèvre Pontalis has recently brought out a work dealing with its artistic affiliations. After investigation Canon Bauxin concludes that the cathedral of Laon, as it exists, is not the one consecrated in 1114 and visited by Innocent II in 1132; that was the restored ancient Romanesque building; the present one was built 1150–1225. Louyis d'Outremer (936), Robert the Pious (996), and Philip I (1059) were anointed in Notre Dame de Laon; in the twelfth century Hermann, Abbot of St. Martin's of Tournai, wrote a volume on the miracles of Notre Dame of Laon. The Hôtel-Dieu of Laon, once known as Hôtellerie Notre Dame, was founded in 1019 by the Laon chapter. The Hôtel-Dieu of Château Thierry was founded in 1304 by Jeanne, wife of Philip the Fair.

== Saints ==
The following are honoured as connected with the religious history of the diocese: St. Marculfus, Abbot of Nanteuil (sixth century) in the Diocese of Coutances, whose relics, transferred to Corbeny in the Diocese of Laon, were visited by the kings of France who, after their anointing at Reims, were wont to go to the tomb of St. Marculfus to cure the king's evil.

Among the natives of the diocese may be mentioned: Petrus Ramus (1515–72), Jean Racine (1639–99), La Fontaine (1621–95), Luc d'Achery (1609–1685), Charlevoix (1683–1761), Camille Desmoulins (1760–1794).

Before the application of the Congregations Law (1901), there were in the Diocese of Soissons Jesuits, Trinitarians, and several teaching congregations of brothers. Some congregations of women had their origin in the diocese: the Nursing and Teaching Sisters of the Child Jesus, with mother-house at Soissons, founded in 1714 by the Madame Brulard de Genlis; the Sisters of Notre Dame de Bon Secours, a nursing and teaching order, founded in 1806, with mother-house at Charly; Sisters of Notre Dame, nursing and teaching order, with mother-house at Saint-Erme, founded in 1820 by the Abbé Chrétien; the Franciscan sisters of the Sacred Heart, a nursing order, founded in 1867, with mother-house at St-Quentin; the Servants of the Heart of Jesus, of whom there are two branches, the "Marys" who lead a contemplative life, and the "Marthas" who nurse the sick; they were founded at Strasburg in 1867, and brought to St-Quentin after the war of 1870–1.

== See also ==
- Councils of Soissons

== Books ==
=== Reference works ===
- Gams, Pius Bonifatius (1873). Series episcoporum Ecclesiae catholicae: quotquot innotuerunt a beato Petro apostolo. Ratisbon: Typis et Sumptibus Georgii Josephi Manz. (Use with caution; obsolete)
- Eubel, Conradus, ed. (1913). Hierarchia catholica, Tomus 1 (second ed.). Münster: Libreria Regensbergiana. (in Latin)
- Eubel, Conradus, ed. (1914). Hierarchia catholica, Tomus 2 (second ed.). Münster: Libreria Regensbergiana. (in Latin)
- Eubel, Conradus; Gulik, Guilelmus, eds. (1923). Hierarchia catholica, Tomus 3 (second ed.). Münster: Libreria Regensbergiana.
- Gauchat, Patritius (Patrice) (1935). Hierarchia catholica IV (1592-1667). Münster: Libraria Regensbergiana.
- Ritzler, Remigius; Sefrin, Pirminus (1952). Hierarchia catholica medii et recentis aevi V (1667-1730). Patavii: Messagero di S. Antonio.
- Ritzler, Remigius; Sefrin, Pirminus (1958). Hierarchia catholica medii et recentis aevi VI (1730-1799). Patavii: Messagero di S. Antonio.
- Ritzler, Remigius; Sefrin, Pirminus (1968). Hierarchia Catholica medii et recentioris aevi sive summorum pontificum, S. R. E. cardinalium, ecclesiarum antistitum series... A pontificatu Pii PP. VII (1800) usque ad pontificatum Gregorii PP. XVI (1846) (in Latin). Vol. VII. Monasterii: Libr. Regensburgiana.
- Remigius Ritzler; Pirminus Sefrin (1978). Hierarchia catholica Medii et recentioris aevi... A Pontificatu PII PP. IX (1846) usque ad Pontificatum Leonis PP. XIII (1903) (in Latin). Vol. VIII. Il Messaggero di S. Antonio.
- Pięta, Zenon (2002). Hierarchia catholica medii et recentioris aevi... A pontificatu Pii PP. X (1903) usque ad pontificatum Benedictii PP. XV (1922) (in Latin). Vol. IX. Padua: Messagero di San Antonio. ISBN 978-88-250-1000-8.
- Sainte-Marthe, Denis de (1751). Gallia christiana in provincia ecclesiasticas distributa (in Latin). Vol. Tomus nonus (9). Paris: Typographia Regia. pp. 333–88, 506–693, 978–1036, Instrumenta, 95–146, 187–202, 359–94.

=== Studies ===
- Bouxin, Auguste (1902). La cathédrale Notre-Dame de Laon (in French) (deuxième ed.). Laon: Impr. du Journal d'Aisne.
- Broche, Lucien (1901). "Les rapports des évêques avec la commune de Laon", in: Nouvelle revue historique de droit français et étranger (in French). Vol. 25. Paris: L. Larose. 1901. pp. 729–743.
- Fisquet, Honoré (1864). La France pontificale (Gallia Christiana). Metropole de Reims. Soissons et Laon (in French). Paris: Etienne Repos.
- Houllier, Pierre (1783). État ecclesiastique et civil du diocese de Soissons (in French). Compiegne: Bertrand. p. 23.
- Jean, Armand (1891). Les évêques et les archevêques de France depuis 1682 jusqu'à 1801 (in French). Paris: A. Picard. pp. 331–335.
- Lecocq, Georges (1875). Histoire de la ville de Saint Quentin (in French). Saint-Quentin: C. Poette.
- Ledouble, Joseph (1880). État religieux ancien & moderne des pays qui forment aujourd'hui le diocèse de Soissons (in French) (self-published ed.). Soissons: Chez l'auteur. p. 568.
- Lefèvre-Pontalis, Eugène Amédée (1897). L'architecture religieuse dans l'ancien diocèse de Soissons au XIe et au XIIe siècle (in French). Paris: Plon, Nourrit.
- Lequeux, J. F. M. (1859). Antiquités religieuses du diocèse de Soissons et Laon (in French). Vol. Tome I. Parmentier. Lequeux, J. F. M. (1859). Tome II. Paris.
- Martin, Henry and Lacroix, Paul. Histoire de Soissons (2 vols, Soissons, 1880)
- Melleville, Maximilien (1846). Histoire de la ville de Laon et de ses institutions civiles judiciares, etc (in French). Vol. Tome I. Laon: à l'impr. du Journal de l'Aisne. Melleville, Maximilien (1846). Tome II (in French). Laon.
- Pécheur, Louis-Victor (1863). Annales du diocèse de Soissons (in French). Vol. Tome premier. Soissons: Morel. Pécheur, Louis Victor (1868). Tome deuxième (2). (10 vols.)
- Poquet, Alexandre Eusèbe (1855). Notre-Dame de Soissons, son histoire, ses églises, ses tombeaux, ses abbesses, ses reliques (in French) (deuxième ed.). Paris: V. Didron.
- Sandron, Dany (1998). La Cathédrale de Soissons: architecture du pouvoir (in French). Paris: Editions A&J Picard. ISBN 978-2-7084-0534-9.
