= Aymar Hennequin =

Aimar or Aymar Hennequin (1543 – 13 January 1596) was a French cleric and bishop.

== Life ==
He was the third son of Dreux Hennequin († 1550), lord of Assy, president of the chambre des comptes of Paris, and his wife Renée Nicolaï. He was elder brother to another bishop, Jérôme Hennequin.

He became canon and clerk-counsellor to the Parlement of Paris before being made Bishop of Rennes on 3 July 1573. He was accused of being a member of the Catholic League and threatened with arrest, forcing him to flee Rennes in 1589. For four years he played a major role in the League's grand counsel in Paris, but without indulging either Charles, Duke of Mayenne or the Kingdom of Spain - of the Breton prelates, only Georges d'Arradon was involved with the foreign factions. After Henry IV of France converted to Catholicism, Hennequin rushed back to his diocese and resumed his place in the Estates of Brittany. At its 1595 sitting he was president of the order of clergy. He was appointed archbishop of Reims and took the oath before the Parliament as a duke and peer of France on 2 April 1594, but he died in 1596 before taking possession of the archdiocese.
