= Loup of Soissons =

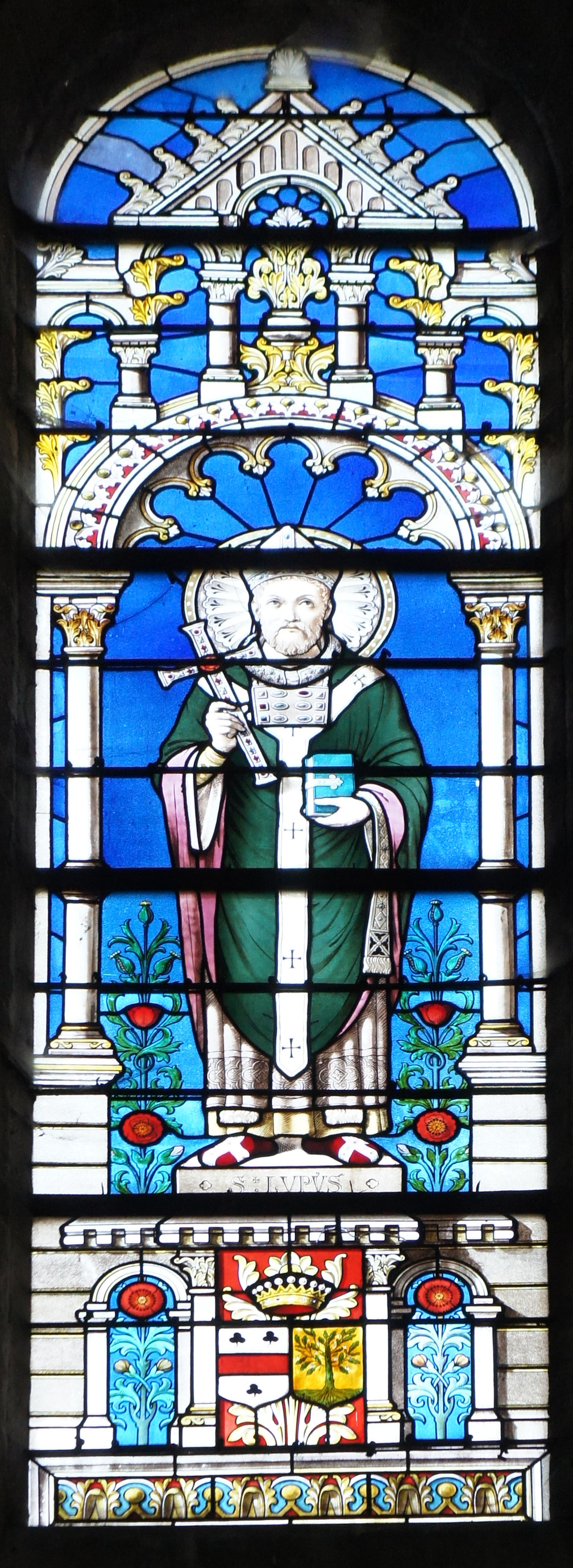
Stained glass window of Saint Loup of Soissons in Saint-Pierre-Saint-Paul church in Épernay.

Loup of Soissons (died c.535 or 540) was a Frankish saint. His feast day was on 19 October, but since the return of the Roman Liturgy has been on 22 October.

== Life ==
He was the nephew of saint Remigius. Most sources state that he was a son of saint Prince, though others state he was a son of Prince's foster brother saint Celsin (by saint Balsamie, Remigius' wet nurse) whilst Hincmar of Reims states he was a son of Aemilius, elder brother of Remigius and Prince. On Prince's death, Remigius ordained Loup and made him the thirteenth bishop of Soissons. Loup followed in Remigius' footsteps and governed the church with great wisdom.

On the advice of Remigius and Melaine, Clovis I called the First Council of Orléans in 511. There Loup met with five metropolitans and twenty-five bishops. It decided twenty-one canons on the right to asylum, episcopal power, abbots' submission to ordinaries and the administration of church lands.

On returning to his diocese Loup applied all the rules he had learned at the Council. At Bazoches he rebuilt and expanded the raised basilica over the tomb of saints Rufinus and Valerius, then gathered 72 priests around this new church under his leadership, in memory of Jesus' 72 disciples, to celebrate the divine office. This chapter survived over four centuries after Loup's death.

Loup acted as Remigius' executor after the latter's death and granted the church in Soissons the rent of ten gold sous from the land of Sablonnières (Seine et Marne), near Coulommiers. Loup died whilst still bishop and was buried beside Prince in the small chapel of saint Thecla. In the 9th century his remains were moved into Soissons Cathedral, where they remained until 16th century Calvinists burned them.

== Sources ==
- Guérin, Paul (1876). "Saint Loup, treizième évêque de Soissons" [Saint Loup, thirteenth bishop of Soissons]. Les petits Bollandistes : vies des saints. Vol. 12. p. 539.
- Flodoard, Gallia Christiana, l'abbé Pécheur.
- Annales P. Richard. Actes de la province de Reims.
