= Céline of Laon =

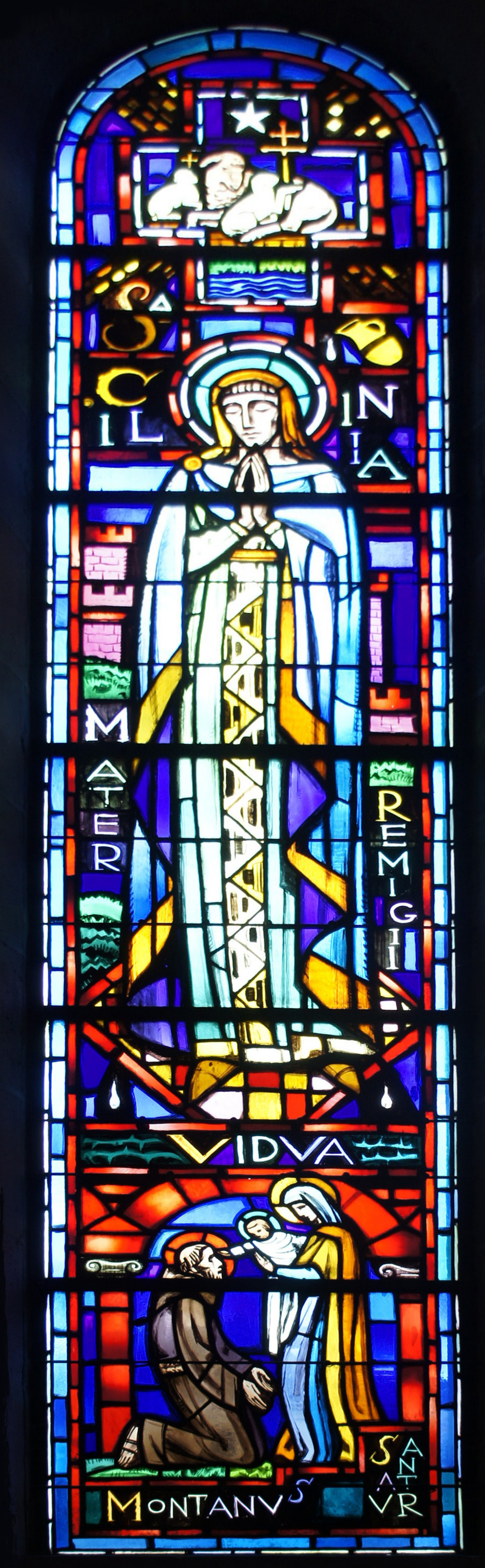
Stained glass window of the saint at the Sainte-Sixte Convent, the former seminary in Rheims.

Céline of Laon (died c. 464) was a Frankish saint, born in the Laonnois (the area around Laon, France). She is most notable as the mother of Saint Remigius and Principius, twelfth bishop of Soissons. Her feast day is on 21 October.

== Hagiography ==
Her husband was Emilius, count of Laon. She was already old when a hermit prophesied to her that she would give birth to a son of great renown:

The Lord has deigned to look down from heaven upon the earth, so that all the nations of the world may proclaim the wonders of his power and so that kings may consider it an honour to serve Him: Céline will be the mother of a son who will be named Remi; I will use him for the deliverance of my people.

The son was born and baptised Remedius or Remigius because he was to heal many ailments in his life.

She had two other sons, Agricola, who became a priest, and Principius, who became Bishop of Soissons. She died at a very old age and was buried at Lavergny near Laon.
