= Théâtre alsacien de Strasbourg =

Group of Alsatian personalities

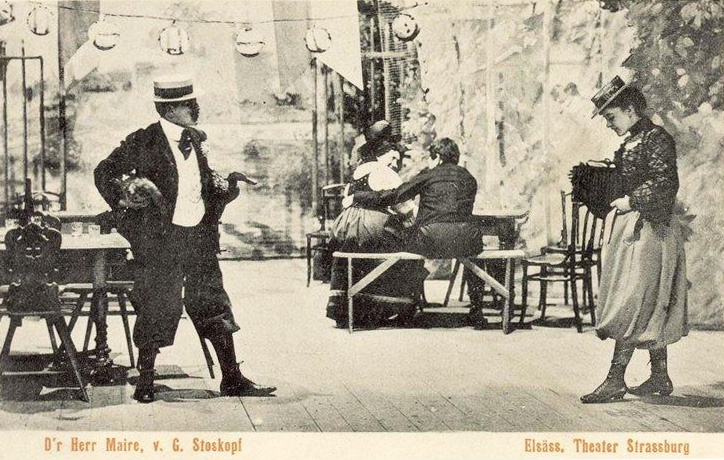
A performance of D'r Herr Maire by Gustave Stoskopf at the municipal theatre of Strasbourg (1908)

The Théâtre alsacien de Strasbourg was created on 2 October 1898 by a group of Alsatian personalities to promote the Alsatian dialect and its traditions.

== History ==
The aim was to present quality plays in the regional idiom. Ferdinand Bastian, Julius Greber, Karl Hauss and Gustave Stoskopf were the co-founders of this theater which settled in 1904 at the Municipal Theater which became the Opéra de Strasbourg.

Except under the German occupation, where the Alsatian theater was banned, this association of amateurs played about thirty performances Place Broglie in Strasbourg. It welcomes 20000 spectators per season. The repertoire is very varied, with dramas, historical plays, Christmas tales, but above all comedies.

The current president (as of 2013) is Pierre Spegt, who has been in charge of this theater since 1998. It is composed of 60 members.

== See also ==
- Théâtre alsacien
- Authors: Roland Engel, Adolphe Horsch

== Bibliography ==
- Ingebjørg Før Gjermundsen, Le Théâtre Alsacien de Strasbourg : vecteur de la langue et la culture alsaciennes. La perception du théâtre dans l'entre-deux-guerres par les Dernières Nouvelles de Strasbourg/Strassburger Neueste Nachrichten, Universitetet i Oslo Institutt for litteratur, områdestudier og europeiske språk, I.F. Gjermundsen, 2010, 123 p.
