= Charles de Hacqueville =

French cleric and bishop

- Bishop of Soissons
- Church: Catholic Church
- Diocese: Diocese of Soissons
- In office: 12 August 1619 – 27 February 1623
- Predecessor: Jérôme Hennequin
- Successor: Simon Legras

Orders
- Consecration: 13 October 1619 by Denis-Simon de Marquemont

Personal details
- Born: 1572 Ons-en-Bray, Île-de-France, Kingdom of France
- Died: 27 February 1623 (aged 50–51) Paris, Kingdom of France

Charles de Hacqueville (c. 1572 – 27 February 1623) was a French cleric and bishop.

== Life ==
His family originated in Artois and moved to Paris in the mid 16th century. He was the son of André, lord of Ons-en-Bray, Master of Requests and his wife Anne Hennequin, daughter of Dreux, Président of the chambre des comptes. He first studied at the Jesuit College in Paris and then studied theology, but gained a licence in canon law, seemingly also at the University of Paris. He spent several years with the Jesuits and remained very close to them. He preached at Saint-Nicolas du Chardonnet in Paris. He became archdeacon of the Vexin in the Diocese of Rouen, regularly visiting its parishes and helped administer the diocese for cardinal François de Joyeuse during the latter's frequent absences from it.

He became bishop of Soissons when his cousin Dreux Hennequin, coadjutor to his uncle Jérôme Hennequin since 1612, declined to succeed Jérôme after his death in March 1619. He was confirmed by pope Paul V and consecrated in October by the archbishop of Lyon. He gave his cathedral two ribs taken from the reliquary of saints Crispin and Crispinian. He died of kidney stones in Paris in 1623.
