= Choisy Cathedral =

Church in Île-de-France, France

Coordinates: 48°45′56″N 2°24′27″E

Choisy Cathedral Cathédrale Saint-Louis-et-Saint-Nicolas de Choisy
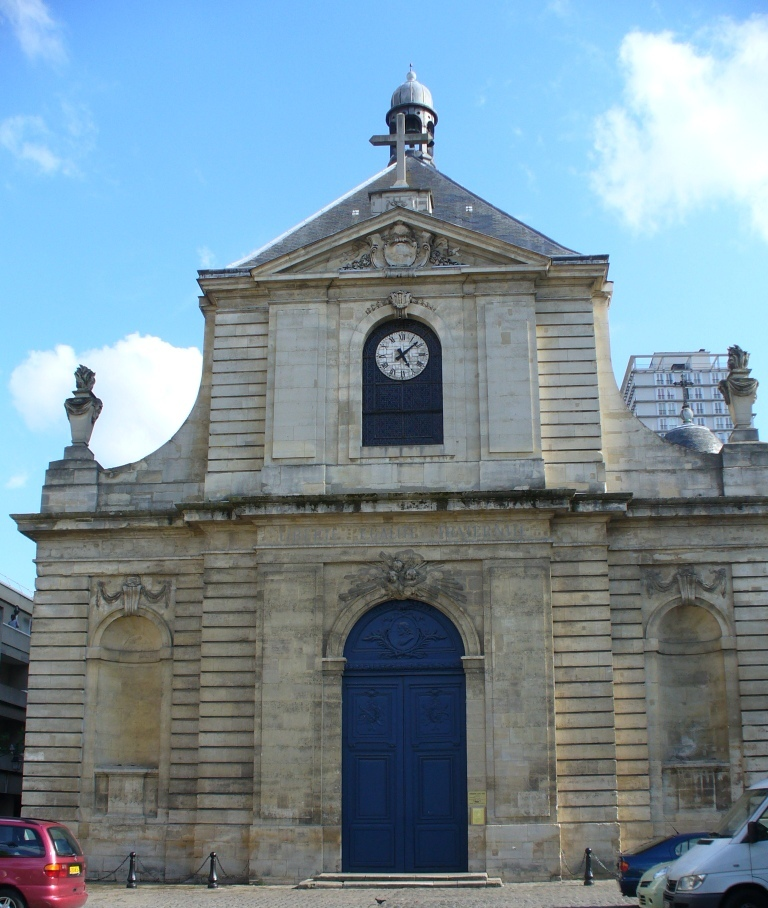
- Choisy Cathedral

Religion
- Affiliation: Roman Catholic Church
- Province: Diocese of Créteil
- Region: Val-de-Marne
- Rite: Roman
- Ecclesiastical or organisational status: Cathedral
- Status: Active

Location
- Location: Choisy-le-Roi, France
- Interactive map of Choisy Cathedral; Cathédrale Saint-Louis-et-Saint-Nicolas de Choisy

Architecture
- Type: church
- Groundbreaking: 1748

Choisy Cathedral (Cathédrale Saint-Louis-et-Saint-Nicolas de Choisy), also known as the Church of St. Louis and St. Nicholas (Église Saint-Louis Saint-Nicolas), is a Roman Catholic church located in Choisy-le-Roi, France. From 1966, when the diocese was established, to 1987, when the present Créteil Cathedral was inaugurated, it served as the first cathedral of the diocese of Créteil.

The church was built by the architect Ange-Jacques Gabriel, under commission from Louis XV to provide a suitable place of worship for the court when the king was staying at his newly purchased residence at the Château de Choisy. The first stone was laid, by the king himself, on 4 July 1748, and the church was dedicated in the presence of the king, the court, and the Archbishop of Paris on 21 September 1760.

== Sources ==
- Diocese of Créteil official website: Cathédrale St. Louis, St. Nicolas, Choisy
