= Jean de Montmirail =

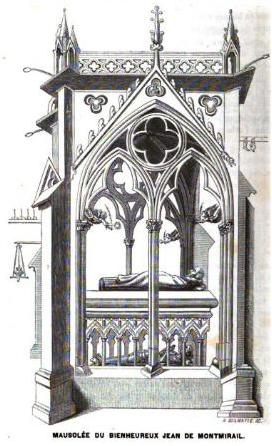
- The mausoleum of John de Montmirail in Longpont Abbey (1641 engraving)

Monk
- Born: 1165
- Died: 29 September 1217 (aged 51–52); Longpont, France
- Venerated in: Roman Catholic Church (Diocese of Soissons)
- Beatified: 1891 by Pope Leo XIII
- Feast: 29 September

Jean de Montmirail (or Monte-Mirabili), Baron de Montmirail, O.S.B. Cist. (1165 – 29 September 1217), was a French nobleman who became a Cistercian monk. He is venerated as a beatus in the Catholic Church.

== Life ==
John was the son of André de Montmirail, Lord of Montmirail and Ferté-Gaucher, and Hildiarde d'Oisy, daughter of Simon d'Oisy, Castellan of Cambrai. He was given a religious upbringing by his mother, and was well educated. He became the first Lord of Condé.

While young, he embraced a military career and was presented at the Royal Court, as constable of France, where he formed a lasting friendship with Philip Augustus (who later became King Philip II of France); he became, not only the friend and favorite of the King, but also later his advisor. On one occasion, John was even said to have saved Philip's life. The dissipations of court life led him to neglect the training of his youth; even his marriage with Helvide de Dampierre, sister of Guy II of Dampierre, failed to effect a change. King Philip II later decorated him with the title of Baron.

In his thirtieth year he met Jobert, Prior of St-Etienne de Montmirail, and experienced a conversion. He built a hospital for the sick of all kinds, but the objects of his predilection were the lepers, and those hopelessly afflicted. He wore a hair-shirt, frequently passing entire nights in prayer. After a while, he entered the Cistercian monastery of Longpont, after having distributed among the poor all his possessions not needed by his wife and family. He was abused for his decision by his former friends. Even members of his own family disapproved of his abandonment of honour and wealth for poverty and subjection.

He died at Longpont on 29 September 1217.

== Veneration ==
Miracles were said to be wrought at his tomb, and attracted pilgrims. By the 1230s, John was being venerated as a miracle-working saint. Pope Leo XIII granted a special office in his honour for the diocese of Soissons. He was beatified in 1891. His feast is celebrated on 29 September.

== Sources ==
- Lester, Anne E. (2017). Creating Cistercian Nuns: The Women’s Religious Movement and Its Reform in Thirteenth-Century Champagne. Cornell University Press.
