= Jérôme Hennequin =

French Roman Catholic cleric

- Bishop of Soissons
- Church: Catholic Church
- Diocese: Diocese of Soissons
- In office: 17 August 1587 – 10 March 1619
- Predecessor: Charles de Roucy
- Successor: Charles de Hacqueville

Orders
- Consecration: 30 August 1587 by François de Joyeuse

Personal details
- Born: 1547
- Died: 10 March 1619 (aged 71–72)

Jérôme Hennequin (1547 – 10 March 1619) was a French cleric and bishop. His elder brother Aymar Hennequin was also a bishop and they both supported the Catholic League.

== Life ==
He was the sixth son of Renée Nicolaï and her husband Dreux Hennequin († 1550), lord of Assy, president of the chambre des comptes of Paris. He was initially a canon of Notre Dame de Paris and was made bishop of Soissons in 1587. He was consecrated bishop by cardinal François de Joyeuse in Rome. He took part in the League's Estates General in Paris in 1593.

In 1610 he ceded to de Joyeuse the privilege of crowning the queen of France Marie de Médicis. In 1612 he gained permission for his nephew Dreux Hennequin de Villenoxe († 1651) to be made coadjutor with right of succession and in 1618 he resigned the commendatory of abbaye Notre-Dame de Bernay in his favour (he had inherited it on Aymar's death in 1596). When Jérôme died in 1619, however, Dreux renounced these titles in favour of his cousin Charles de Hacqueville, another of Jérôme's nephews via his mother Anne Hennequin, who had Charles confirmed as bishop by pope Paul V on 12 August 1619.
