= Daniel Labille =

French Roman Catholic prelate (1932–2022)

His Excellency Daniel Labille
- Bishop Emeritus of Créteil
- Metropolis: Paris
- Appointed: 25 March 1998
- Term ended: 4 September 2007
- Predecessor: François-Victor-Marie Frétellière
- Successor: Michel Santier
- Previous posts: Auxiliary Bishop of Soissons and Titular Bishop of Fata (1978–1984); Bishop of Soissons (1984–1998)

Orders
- Ordination: 15 April 1956
- Consecration: 17 September 1978 by Jacques Eugène Louis Ménager

Personal details
- Born: 15 October 1932 Nouvion-sur-Meuse, France
- Died: 31 December 2022 (aged 90) Charleville-Mézières, France

Daniel Camille Victor Marie Labille (15 October 1932 – 31 December 2022) was a French Roman Catholic prelate.

Labille was born in France and was ordained to the priesthood in 1956. Labille served as titular bishop of Fata and was auxiliary bishop of the Roman Catholic Diocese of Soissons, France from 1978 to 1984 and as bishop of the Soissons Diocese from 1984 to 1998. Labille then served as bishop of the Roman Catholic Diocese of Créteil from 1998 until his retirement in 2007.

Catholic Church titles
Preceded by François-Victor-Marie Frétellière	Bishop of Créteil; 1998–2007	Succeeded by Michel Santier
Preceded by Alphonse-Gérard Bannwarth	Bishop of Soissons; 1984–1998	Succeeded by Marcel Herriot
Preceded by —	Auxiliary Bishop of Soissons; 1978–1984	Succeeded by —
Preceded by Odilo Etspüler	Titular Bishop of Fata; 1978–1984	Succeeded by Paul Kazuhiro Mori
