= Rothad of Soissons =

Rothad of Soissons (died 869) was the Bishop of Soissons. In a conflict of authority with Hincmar of Reims, he was deposed as bishop in 862/3, by the Synod of Soissons. The issue was whether Rothad, suffragan bishop to Hincmar, had the legal right to deprive a priest.

Rothad was restored in 865 by Pope Nicholas I, through the papal legate Arsenius, Bishop of Orta. The hearing in Rome of his case has been cited as the first judicial use of the False Decretals.

== Sources ==
- Fisquet, Honoré (1864). La France pontificale (Gallia Christiana). Metropole de Reims. Soissons et Laon (in French). Paris: Etienne Repos. pp. 20–24.
- Sainte-Marthe, Denis de (1751). Gallia christiana in provincia ecclesiasticas distributa (in Latin). Vol. Tomus nonus (9). Paris: Typographia Regia. pp. 340–343.
