= Charles-Gustave Stoskopf =

French architect

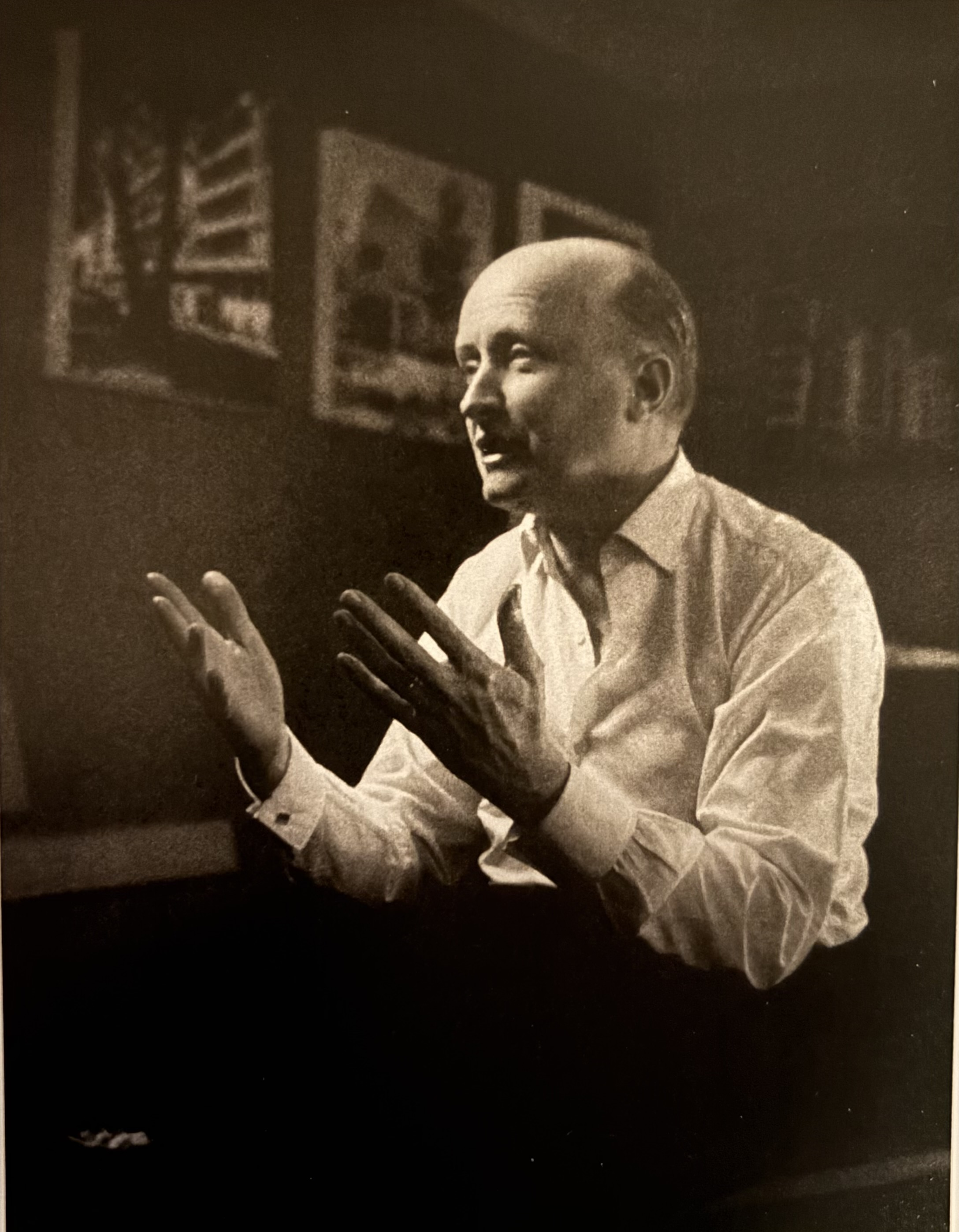
- Born: 2 September 1907; Strasbourg, France
- Died: 22 January 2004 (aged 96); Paris, France
- Education: École régionale d'architecture de Strasbourg; École nationale supérieure des Beaux-Arts
- Occupation: Architect
- Parent: Gustave Stoskopf

Charles-Gustave Stoskopf (2 September 1907 – 22 January 2004) was a French architect. He designed buildings in Strasbourg, Colmar and Créteil. He won the second Prix de Rome in architecture in 1933.

== Early life ==
Charles-Gustave Stoskopf was born in Strasbourg on 2 September 1907. His father, Gustave Stoskopf, was a polymath: poet, painter, playwright and publisher.

Stoskopf studied architecture at the École régionale d'architecture de Strasbourg in Strasbourg. He graduated from the École nationale supérieure des Beaux-Arts, where his professors included Emmanuel Pontremoli and Jacques Debat-Ponsan.

== Career ==
Stoskopf won the second Prix de Rome in architecture in 1933.

In the aftermath of World War II, Stoskopf began designing new buildings demolished by the war in the villages of Alsace, especially near Colmar, and in the Territoire de Belfort. He redesigned the Place de l'Homme-de-Fer in Strasbourg from 1952 to 1956. Meanwhile, from 1954 to 1970, he designed housing estates like Colmar's ZUP, Créteil's Mont-Mesly, or Strasbourg's Canardière, Esplanade and Quai des Belges. He also designed churches, like the Notre-Dame Cathedral in Créteil in 1976.

Stoskopf authored a novel in 1998.

== Death ==
Stoskopf died in Paris on 22 January 2004.

== Works ==
- Stoskopf, Charles-Gustave (1998). Monsieur de Castel-Mandailles en mission spéciale en Alsace. Strasbourg: Oberlin. ISBN 9782853691789. OCLC 468397663.
