= Divitianus =

Saint Divitianus was a 3rd-century pre-congregational saint of France. He was the Bishop of Soissons from about 310 to 320, and the grandson of Saint Sinicus. He died in the first quarter of the 4th century and is thought to have been buried in the Basilica of Abbaye de Saint-Crespin-le-Grand.

His feast day is 5 October.
