= Longpont Abbey =

Cistercian abbey in Longpont, France

Coordinates: 49.273°N 3.221°E

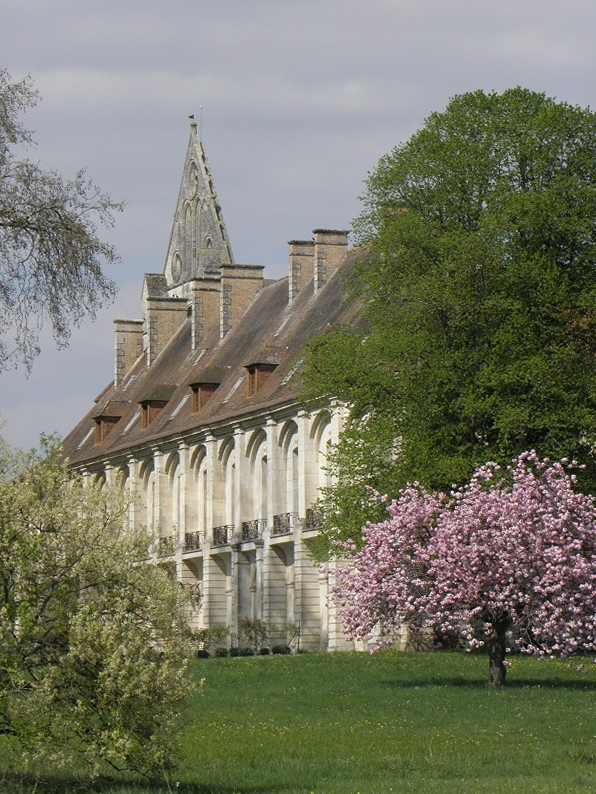
View of surviving claustral buildings from the west

Longpont Abbey (Abbaye Notre-Dame de Longpont) was a Cistercian monastery, in present-day Longpont, Aisne, France.

It existed from 1131 to 1793, being founded by monks from the abbey of Clairvaux, at the behest of Jocelin of Soissons. There is now a hotel on the site, located in the old Cistercian inn. The roofless abbey church can be visited, along with the better-preserved buildings around the cloister. The original buildings suffered war damage in 1918.

Its monks included Peter the Chanter and John de Montmirail.

== Burials ==
- Raoul II, Count of Vermandois
- Eleanor, Countess of Vermandois
- Jean de Montmirail
