= Sinicus =

3rd-century French saint and Bishop of Soissons

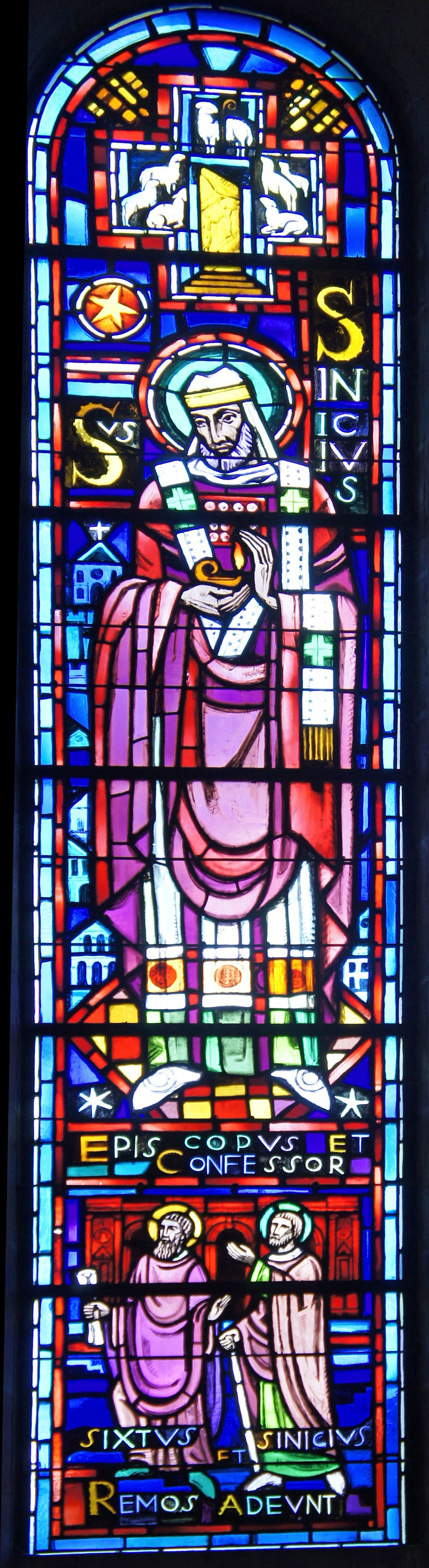
Sinice in the chapelle de l'ancien séminaire at Reims.

Sinicius of Reims or Saint Sinicius was a 3rd-century French saint and Bishop of Soissons.

As a priest, Sinice evangelized the regions of Soissons and Reims in the company of Sixtus of Reims, who appointed him Bishop of Soissons. Sinice was Bishop of Reims following Sixtus, a position he held from 280 until 286 AD.

He was originally buried with Sixtus but was transferred in the 10th century, to the Church Saint-Rémi de Reims. His Feast day is on 1 September in the company of Nivard and Sixtus.
