= Adolphe Horsch =

French playwright and actor

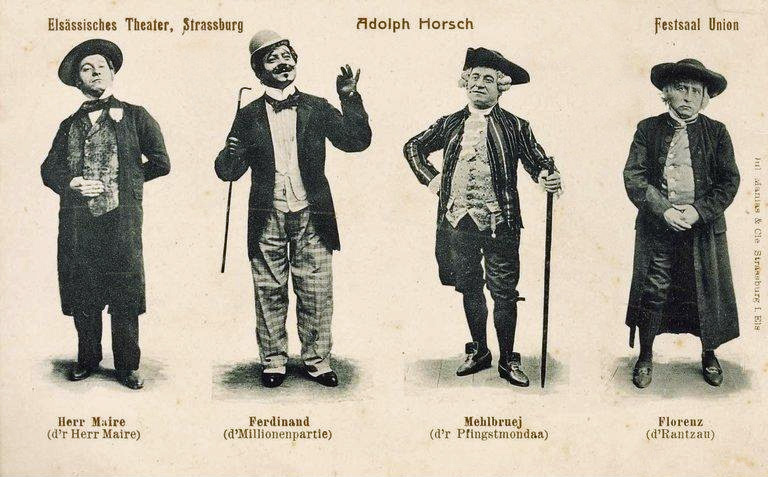
- Born: Daniel Gustave Adolphe Horsch; 4 May 1864; Strasbourg, French Empire
- Died: 27 March 1937 (aged 72); Strasbourg, France
- Occupations: Playwright, actor

Adolphe Horsch (1864–1937) was a notable Alsatian playwright and actor who wrote many pieces for the theatre in the Alsatian dialect. He was one of the premier actors in Alsace in the late 19th and early 20th centuries. He worked closely with his friend, the playwright Gustave Stoskopf.

== Selection of works ==
- Der Hüsherr ! : Lustspiel in einem Akt, 1892
- 4 Stroßburger Komedie : 1. Serie, 1895 (Der Hüsherr : Lustspiel in 1 Akt; D'r Unkel : comédie in 1 Akt; E Mann fur mini nièce : e comédie-bouffe in 1 Akt; Neui Hosse : comédie-bouffe in 1 Akt)
- 2 Stroßburjer Komödie : 2. Serie, 1902 (E Surprise : e kleins Komödie in einem Akt; E Stariker ! : Schwank in einem Akt freij noch e-me andere Stück)
