= Onesimus of Soissons =

French saint and bishop of Soissons from c. 350 to 361 AD

St. Onesimus, was a 4th-century bishop and pre-congregational saint of France. He was the fifth bishop of Soissons, being appointed about 350 AD and holding office till 361 AD.

He died in 361 AD and his feast day is May 13.
