= Michel Santier =

French Catholic bishop

- Bishop Emeritus of Créteil
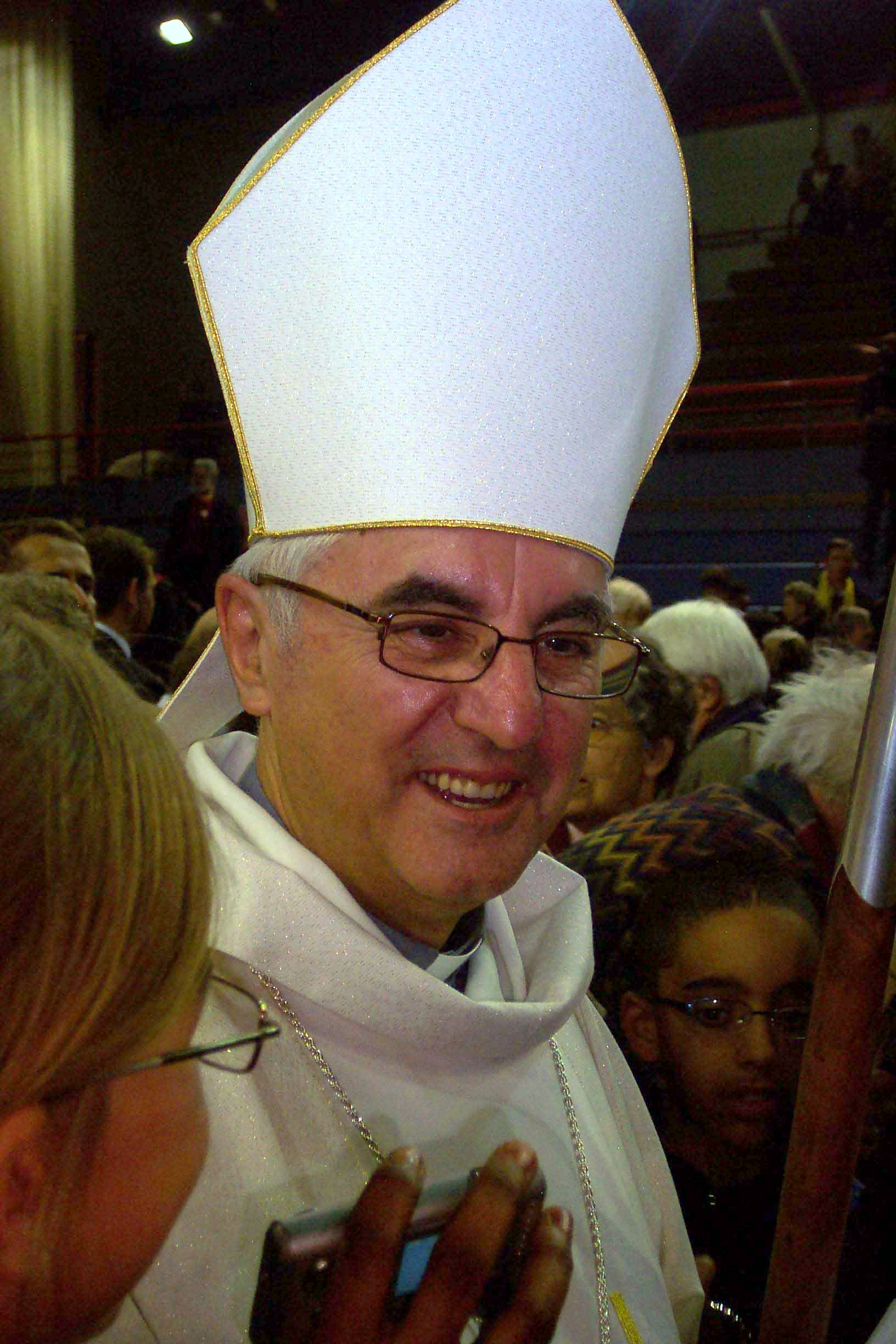
- Michel Santier in 2007
- Church: Catholic Church
- See: Diocese of Créteil
- Installed: 4 September 2007
- Term ended: 9 January 2021
- Predecessor: Daniel Labille
- Successor: Dominique Blanchet

Orders
- Ordination: 7 July 1973
- Consecration: 23 September 2001 by Jacques Fihey
- Rank: Prelate

Personal details
- Born: 20 May 1947 (age 77); Granville, France

Michel Santier (born 20 May 1947) is a French prelate of the Catholic Church who served as bishop of Luçon from 2001 to 2007 and of bishop of Créteil from 2007 to 2021. Though poor health was the original explanation for his early retirement, he had privately admitted to Vatican officials that he had taken sexual advantage of his clerical status decades earlier by subjecting two young men to voyeurism. The Vatican imposed restrictions on him in retirement.

== Biography ==
Michel Léon Émile Santier was born on 20 May 1947 in Granville (Manche). He studied at the minor and major seminaries of his native diocese of Coutances and then at the interdiocesan seminary in Caen. He then obtained a licentiate in sacred scripture from the Pontifical Biblical Institute. He was ordained a priest of the Diocese of Coutances on 7 July 1973.

He was vice-parish priest of the Cathedral of Coutances and chaplain of Catholic Action (1976-1978); head of the diocesan service for vocations and pilgrimages for young people (1976-1990); at the same time, professor of exegesis at the interdiocesan seminary of Caen (1978-2001); head of the "Ecole de la Foi" for young people from the dioceses of Western France; episcopal vicar in charge of the ongoing formation of priests and lay people, and diocesan delegate for ecumenism (1996-2001).

Pope John Paul II named him bishop of Luçon on 19 June 2001. He received his episcopal consecration on 23 September.

Pope Benedict XVI appointed him bishop of Créteil on 4 September 2007. He was installed on 18 November.

During his years as a bishop he became a well known figure for charismatic renewal and the social gospel, committed to interreligious dialogue and "synodality before it was fashionable".

=== Resignation ===
On 5 June 2020, he announced that Pope Francis had accepted his resignation as bishop which he had submitted at the end of 2019 for health reasons two and a half years in advance of the standard retirement age of 75. He mentioned respiratory problems and wrote he had "undergone other difficulties". He had been hospitalized in the spring of 2020 with COVID-19 as well. He said he remained weak but would continue as bishop, though in the process of withdrawal, until his successor was named.

Pope Francis announced the acceptance of Santier's resignation and the appointment of his successor on 9 January 2021. In reporting the personnel change, Vatican News wrote that Santier "had handed over his office to the Holy Father last June for health reasons".

On 14 October 2022, the weekly magazine Famille Chrétienne (FC) reported that the circumstances of Santier's departure from Créteil were not as he had described: that in 2019 two men asserted that in the 1990s Santier, while a priest in Coutances with responsibility for guiding the prayer group of those between the ages of 18 and 30, "exercised a psycho-spiritual influence and used his authority over the two young adult men for sexual purposes", specifically voyeurism, (Note: Golias publishing had outlined the story of Santier and the charges against him earlier, but without FC's detailed sourcing, mentioning it several times in its biennial assessment of the French Church hierarchy, Trombinoscope des évêques de France, 2022–2023. According to Golias, the practice at issue required the penitent to divest himself of an article of clothing as he confessed each of his sins before receiving absolution, known as "strip confession". (English in original).) and that he had used the sacrament of confession in doing so. The two provided information to Church officials but did not file a criminal complaint. The Archbishop of Paris, Michel Aupetit, whose jurisdiction includes Créteil, forwarded a report of their witness to the Congregation for the Doctrine of the Faith (CDF) in December 2019; Santier acknowledged the truth of their testimony and tendered his resignation about the same time. There followed Santier's announcement of his progressive retirement (June 2020) and his replacement (January 2021). Without public notice, in October 2021, almost two years after receiving Aupetit's report, the CDF imposed disciplinary sanctions on Santier, who was by then bishop emeritus of Créteil. (Note: In retirement Santier was living in Saint-Pair-sur-Mer, not far from his birthplace in the Manche department.) He was forbidden to exercise his ministry except to act as chaplain for the community of nuns where he was required to live, the abbey of Saint-Sauveur-le-Vicomte. Bishop Dominique Blanchet, Santier's successor in Créteil, confirmed FC's reporting, as did the bishop of Coutances, Laurent Le Boulc'h, who had chosen the abbey when informed of the sanctions in October 2021.
