= Jocelin of Soissons =

French theologian

Jocelin of Soissons (died 24 October 1152) was a French theologian, a philosophical opponent of Peter Abelard. He became bishop of Soissons, and is known also as a composer, with two pieces in the Codex Calixtinus. He was teaching at the Paris cathedral school in the early 1110s.

== Bishop ==
He began work on the present Soissons Cathedral; it only took shape in the 1190s.

Abbot Suger addressed his history of Louis the Fat to him. In the papal politics of the late 1120s and 1130s, Suger counted Jocelin, at Soissons from 1126, as a supporter of Pope Innocent II against antipope Anacletus II, along with other bishops of northern France.

As bishop he founded Longpont Abbey in 1131, a Cistercian monastery supported by Bernard of Clairvaux; Bernard was a correspondent. He favoured the Knights Templars, having participated in the Council of Troyes that gave them full standing. He was present at the 1146 Council of Arras, a probable occasion for the planning of the Second Crusade.

== Works ==
The De generibus et speciebus has been attributed to him. Now scholars call its author Pseudo-Joscelin. It may be by a student of his. The Metalogicus of John of Salisbury attributed to him the view that universals exist only in the collection, not the individuals.
