= Abbo (bishop of Soissons) =

Bishop of Soissons from 909 (died 937)

Abbo (died 937) was the bishop of Soissons from 909. Throughout his episcopate, he was "under the thumb" of Count Herbert II of Vermandois (907–943).

In 925, Abbo attended the uncanonical synod convoked in Reims by Count Herbert, who had his five-year-old son Hugh elected archbishop by the pliant clergy (including Bishop Bovo of Châlons) and the people of the city. This synod was retroactively approved by both King Rudolph of France and Pope John X, who gave Herbert the administration of the archdiocese's temporalities and Abbo, technically Hugh's suffragan, responsibility for its spiritual functioning, including its services.

In 927 the pope revoked Abbo's charge and gave the spiritual administration of Reims to Odalric, the bishop of Aix-en-Provence, who had fled his see in the face of raids from the Muslim pirates based at Fraxinetum.

== Sources ==
- McKitterick, Rosamond (1983). The Frankish Kingdoms under the Carolingians, 751–987. London: Longman.
- Duckett, Eleanor Shipley (1967). Death and Life in the Tenth Century. Ann Arbor: University of Michigan Press.
