= Créteil Cathedral =

Roman Catholic Church

Coordinates: 48°47′23″N 2°26′39″E

Créteil Cathedral Cathédrale Notre-Dame de Créteil
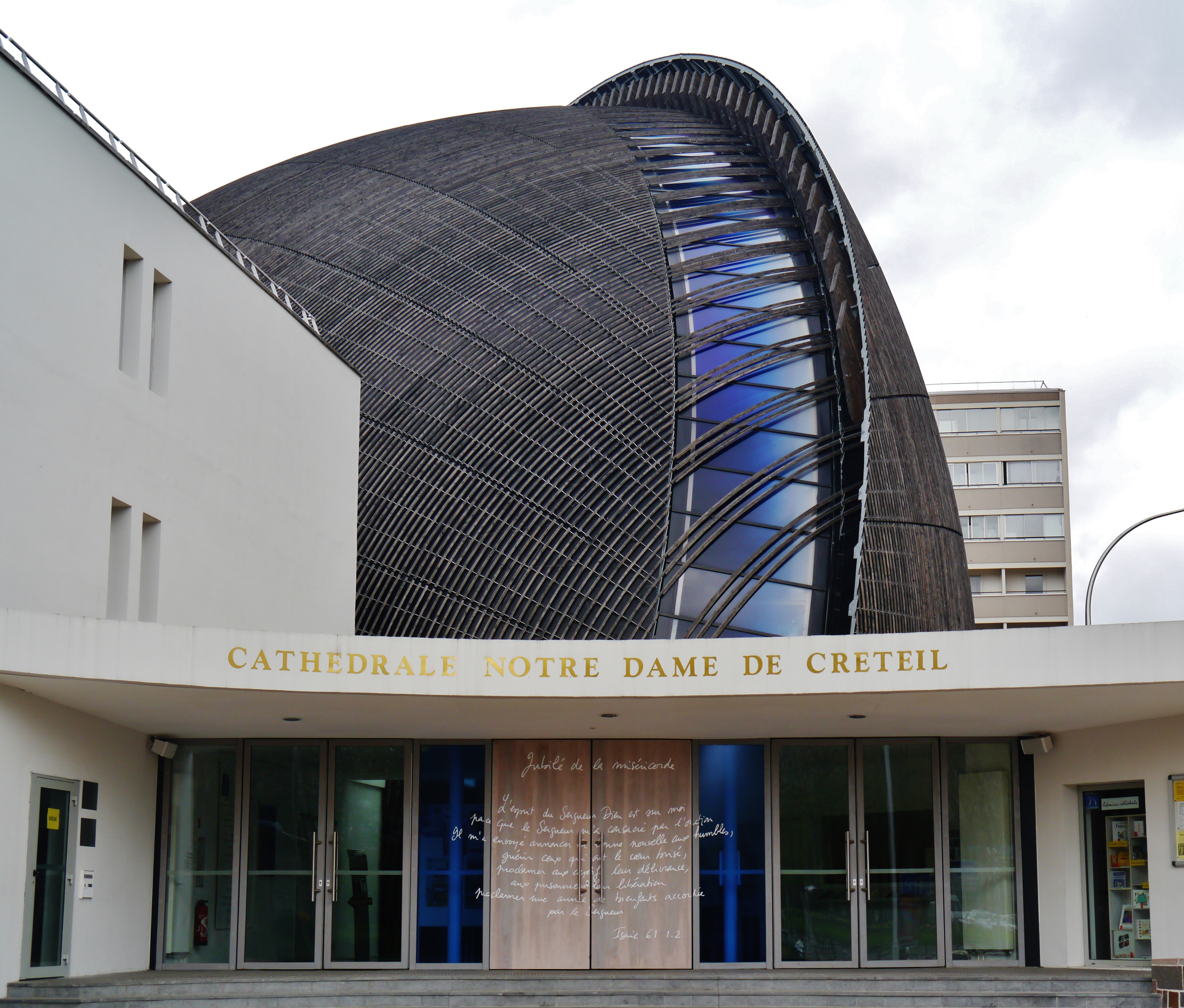

Religion
- Affiliation: Roman Catholic
- Province: Bishopric of Créteil
- Region: Val-de-Marne
- Rite: Roman
- Ecclesiastical or organisational status: Cathedral
- Status: Active

Location
- Location: Créteil, France
- Interactive map of Créteil Cathedral; Cathédrale Notre-Dame de Créteil

Architecture
- Type: church
- Groundbreaking: 1966

Créteil Cathedral (French: Cathédrale Notre-Dame de Créteil) is a Roman Catholic church in Créteil, Val-de-Marne, France. The present cathedral was completed in 2015, replacing the previous building. It is the seat of the Bishopric of Créteil, created in 1966.

== First building ==
The first cathedral on the site was formerly a parish church opened on 18 June 1976, which was chosen as the cathedral of the new diocese in 1987. A modest structure, as was the wish of the ecclesiastical authorities of the period, it was located between the district of Montaigut and the Université Paris XII Val-de-Marne.

Before the consecration in 1976, the interim cathedral of the diocese was the church of Saint Louis and Saint Nicholas at Choisy-le-Roi.

== Present building ==
On 19 and 20 June 2010 a project was announced ( the Projet Créteil Cathédrale+) to bring about the transformation of the original modest cathedral building into a more welcoming, more luminous and more visible symbol of the presence of the Church in Val-de-Marne. The works began in 2013 with the demolition of the initial building. The new cathedral, designed by the architect Charles-Gustave Stoskopf, opened for worship in 2015.

== Sources and external links ==
- Créteil Cathedral at Structurae
- Catholic Hierarchy: Diocese of Créteil
- Website of Projet CréteilCathédrale+ (in French)
