= Marcel Herriot =

French Roman Catholic bishop

- Bishop of Soissons
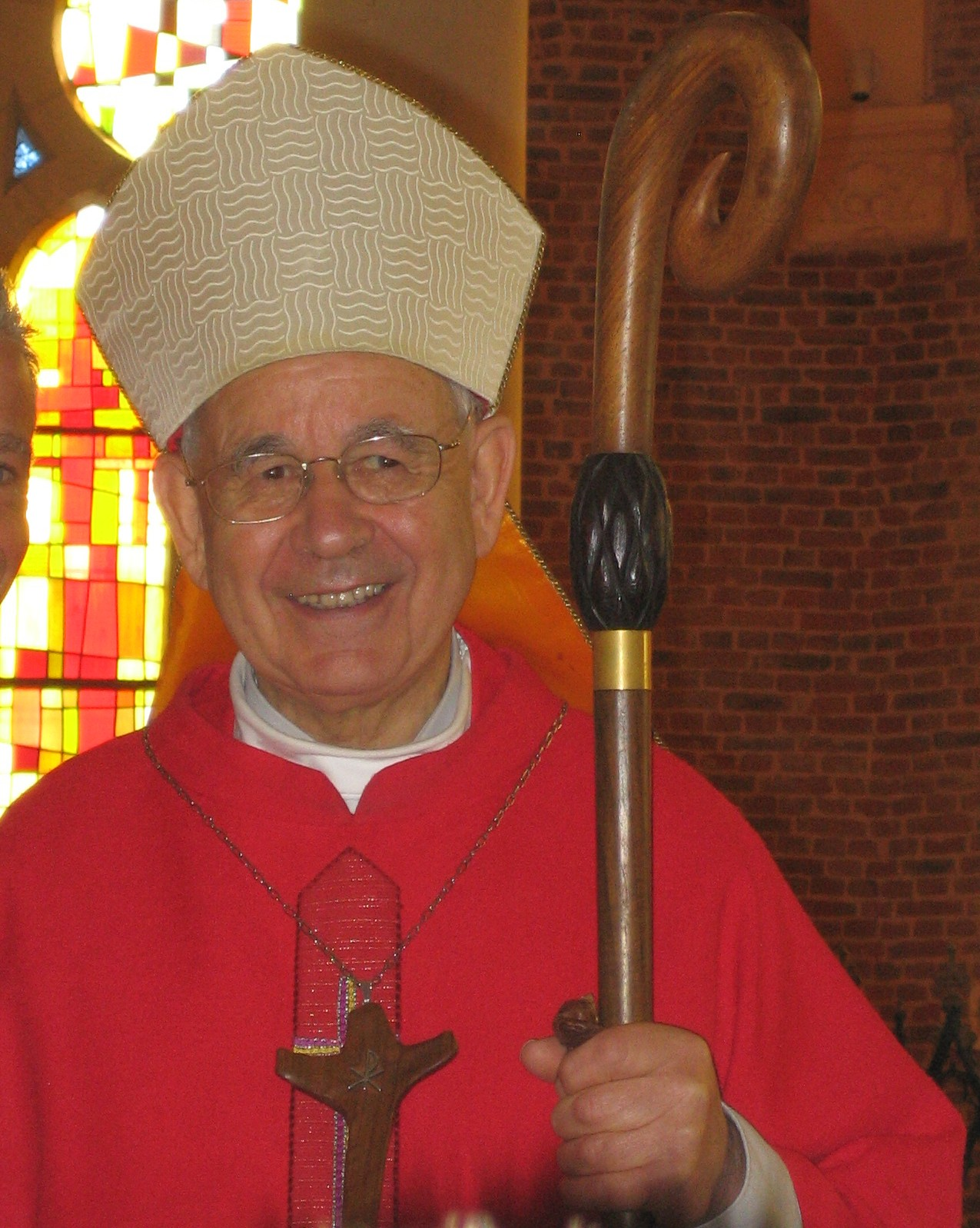
- Church: Catholic Church
- Diocese: Diocese of Soissons
- In office: 29 April 1999 – 22 February 2008
- Predecessor: Daniel Labille
- Successor: Hervé Giraud
- Previous post: Bishop of Verdun (1987-1999)

Orders
- Ordination: 18 April 1960
- Consecration: 28 June 1987 by Jean-Félix-Albert-Marie Vilnet

Personal details
- Born: 18 May 1934 Moussey, Vosges, Franch
- Died: 14 September 2017 (aged 83)

Marcel Paul Herriot (18 May 1934 – 14 September 2017) was a Roman Catholic bishop.

Ordained to the priesthood in 1960, Herriot served as bishop of the Roman Catholic Diocese of Verdun, France, from 1987 to 1999. He then served as bishop of the Roman Catholic Diocese of Soissons from 1999 to 2008.
