= Les Petits Bollandistes =

Les Petits Bollandistes (French pronunciation: [le pəti bɔlɑ̃dist]) is a 17-volume collection of lives of the saints by Paul Guérin, published in Paris in 1865.
