= Georges d'Arradon =

16th-century French Catholic bishop

- Bishop of Vannes
- Church: Catholic Church
- Diocese: Diocese of Vannes
- In office: 10 March 1593 – 31 May 1596
- Predecessor: Louis de La Haye
- Successor: Jacques Martin de Belle-Assise

Orders
- Consecration: June 1593 by Filippo Sega

Personal details
- Born: 1562 Quinipily, Baud, Province of Brittany, Kingdom of France
- Died: 31 May 1596 (aged 33–34) Vannes, Province of Brittany, Kingdom of France

Georges d'Arradon (1562, Baud – 31 May 1596, Vannes) was a French Catholic cleric and bishop. His brothers were Jérôme (lord of Quinipily and governor of Hennebont), René (governor of Vannes), Christophe (lord of Camors and Louis (lord of La Grandville).

== Biography ==
He was one of five children born to René d'Arradon, lord of Kerdréan, Qinipily, Camors, Botblezven and La Grandville and founder of the Jesuit College in Vannes and to Claude de Guého, according to Barthélémy Pocquet, he was the third of the brothers of this name by age but the first by intelligence".

Although we know nothing about his education, he seems to have held a licence in utroque jure. He was lord of Le Plessis in Caudan and his first recorded role was as counsellor to the Parlement of Rennes (1587–1590) before joining the 'League Parliament' at Nantes in January 1590. He resolutely turned towards Catholicism and became abbot commendatory to Melleray Abbey in 1587. He was very favourable to the League and was made Bishop of Vannes by the canonical chapter "at the request" of Philippe Emmanuel, Duke of Mercœur on 13 February 1590. He was confirmed by pope on 10 March 1593. At the Council of Trent he requested that the Jesuits open a college at Vannes. He died prematurely on 31 May 1596 and was buried in his cathedral.
