= Principius of Soissons =

Principius (French: Prince, Principe; died 25 September 505) was the twelfth bishop of Soissons from around 474. He was the father or uncle of Lupus of Soissons and brother of Remigius of Reims. His episcopate included major events such as the end of the Roman rule and the confirmation of the Frankish supremacy.

He witnessed the death of Egidius, magister militum of the Gauls (464), and the defeat of his son Syagrius by Clovis I in 486. Soissons fell into the victor's hands and became the headquarters for the Frankish monarchy. After the loss of his army, Syagrius fled to Toulouse, home of Alaric II, king of the Visigoths, who handed him over to Clovis for execution.

Principius's qualities brought him to Clovis' attention. This reinforced his influence over Clovis' wife Clotilde and encouraged her to try harder to get her husband to convert to Christianity. Clovis was baptised by Remigius with 3000 others, but Principius took part in the service in the presence of the college of the bishops of Gaul. On returning to Soissons Principius assisted the new converts to live according to the Christian faith.

The newly converted Clovis' generosity enabled Principius to expand Christianity's presence in the Frankish Empire and to soften people's fates. He built new churches and increased the number of altars and parishes to make education more accessible. Principius and Remigius both corresponded with Sidonius Apollinaris (Book IX.8), whose letters give an idea of the elegant and very cultivated Gallo-Roman literary style that all three men had in common.

Principius was buried by Remigius in the chapel of saint Thecla, though his relics were later transferred to Soissons Cathedral before being burned to ashes by heretics in 1567. Gallia Christiana by Léon-Paul Piolin specifies that his arm was venerated at the collegiate church of Saint-Amé.

== Sources ==
- S. Prince ou Principe, XII. Evesque », dans Histoire de la ville de Soissons, de Claude Dormay, tome 1, Soissons : chez Nicolas Asseline, 1663, p. 143
- Vies des Saints by Monsignor Guérin (obtenu lui-même par la notice due à M. Henri Congnet, chanoine de Soissons) 1870
