= Gustave Stoskopf =

French painter

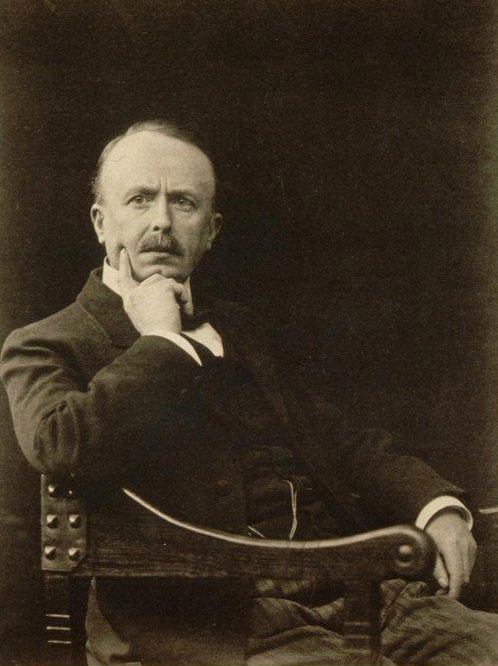
- Gustave Stoskopf circa 1912
- Born: 8 July 1869; Brumath, Bas-Rhin, France
- Died: 6 December 1944 (aged 75); Brumath, Bas-Rhin, France
- Education: Académie Julian; École nationale supérieure des Beaux-Arts
- Occupations: Painter, playwright, poet
- Children: Charles-Gustave Stoskopf

Gustave Stoskopf (8 July 1869 – 6 December 1944) was a French painter, playwright, poet, draughtsman and publisher from Alsace. He graduated from the Académie Julian and the École nationale supérieure des Beaux-Arts. He served as the director of the Théâtre alsacien de Strasbourg. He authored plays in the Alsatian dialect. He was made Chevalier de la Légion d'Honneur in 1931.

The Musée Gustave-Stoskopf in Brumath in the Bas-Rhin department of France is dedicated to Stoskopf's work.

Stoskopf was the father of the prolific French architect Charles-Gustave Stoskopf.

== Gallery ==
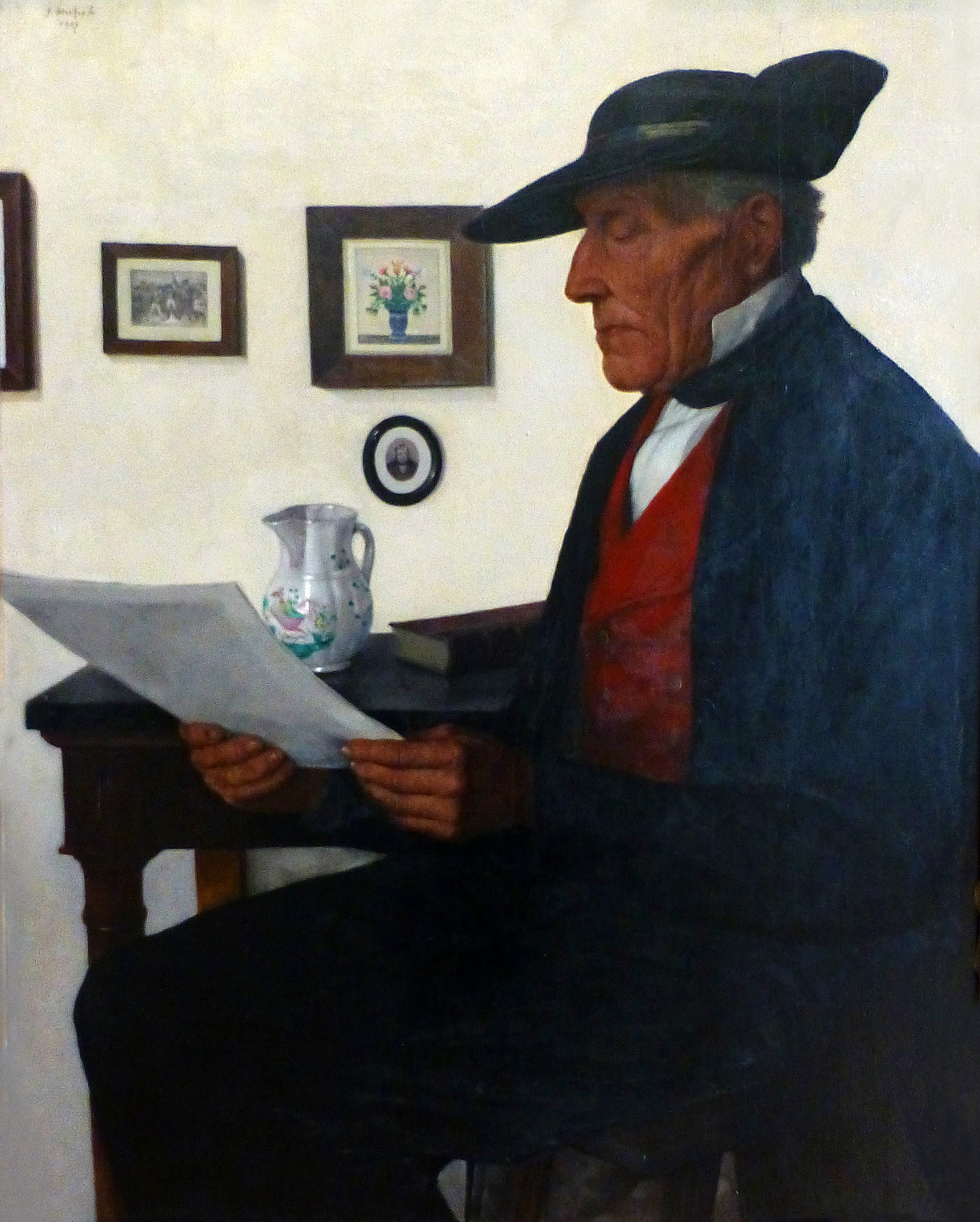
The Reader (oil on panel, 1927), Musée historique de Haguenau

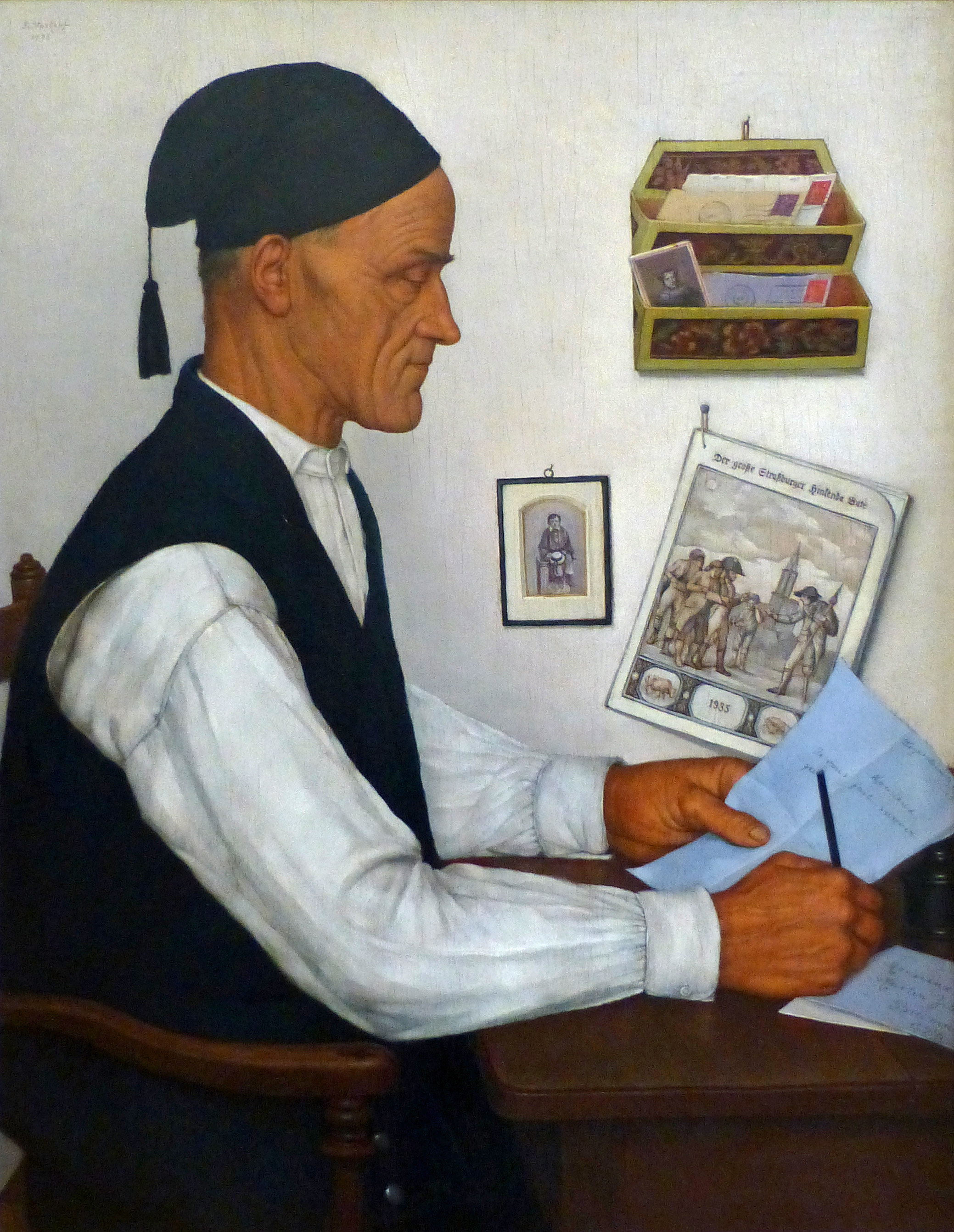
Le Messager boiteux (oil on panel, 1935) ["Le Messager boiteux" is the title of the almanac pinned to the wall], Musée historique de Haguenau

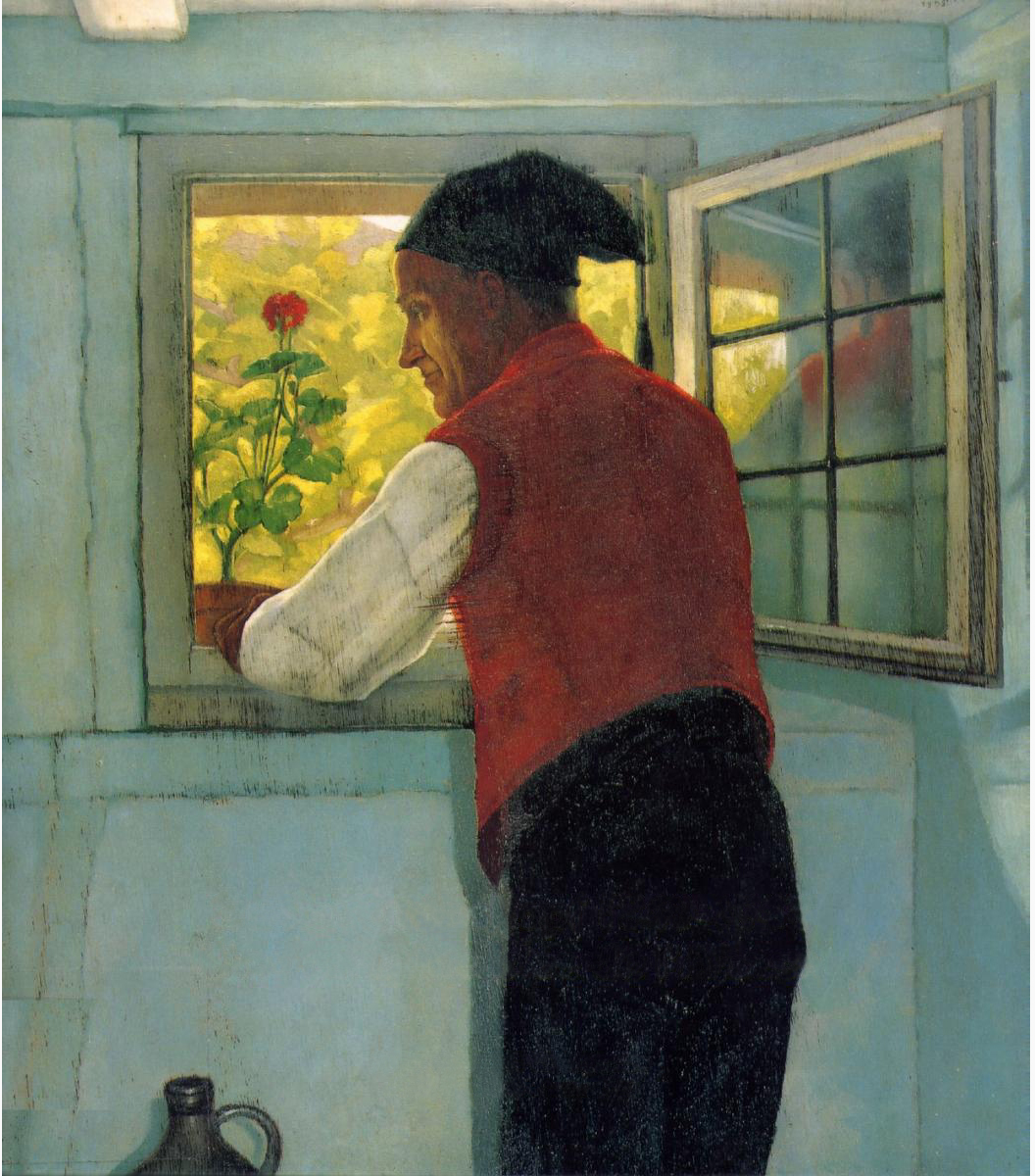
Farmer at the window

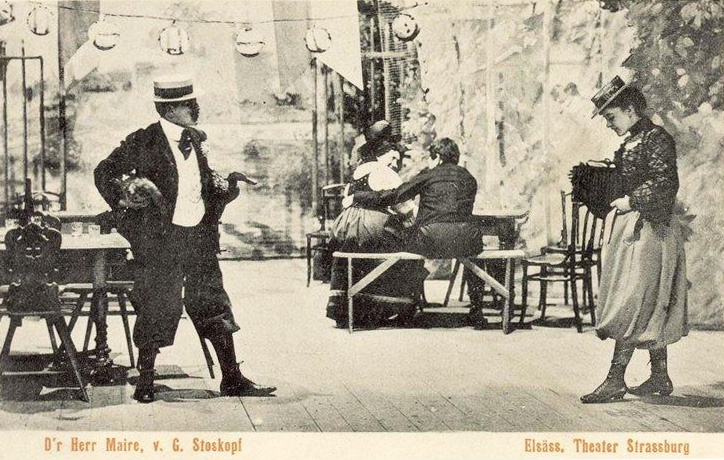
Performance of Stoskopf's play D'r Herr Maire ["Mister Mayor"] in 1908

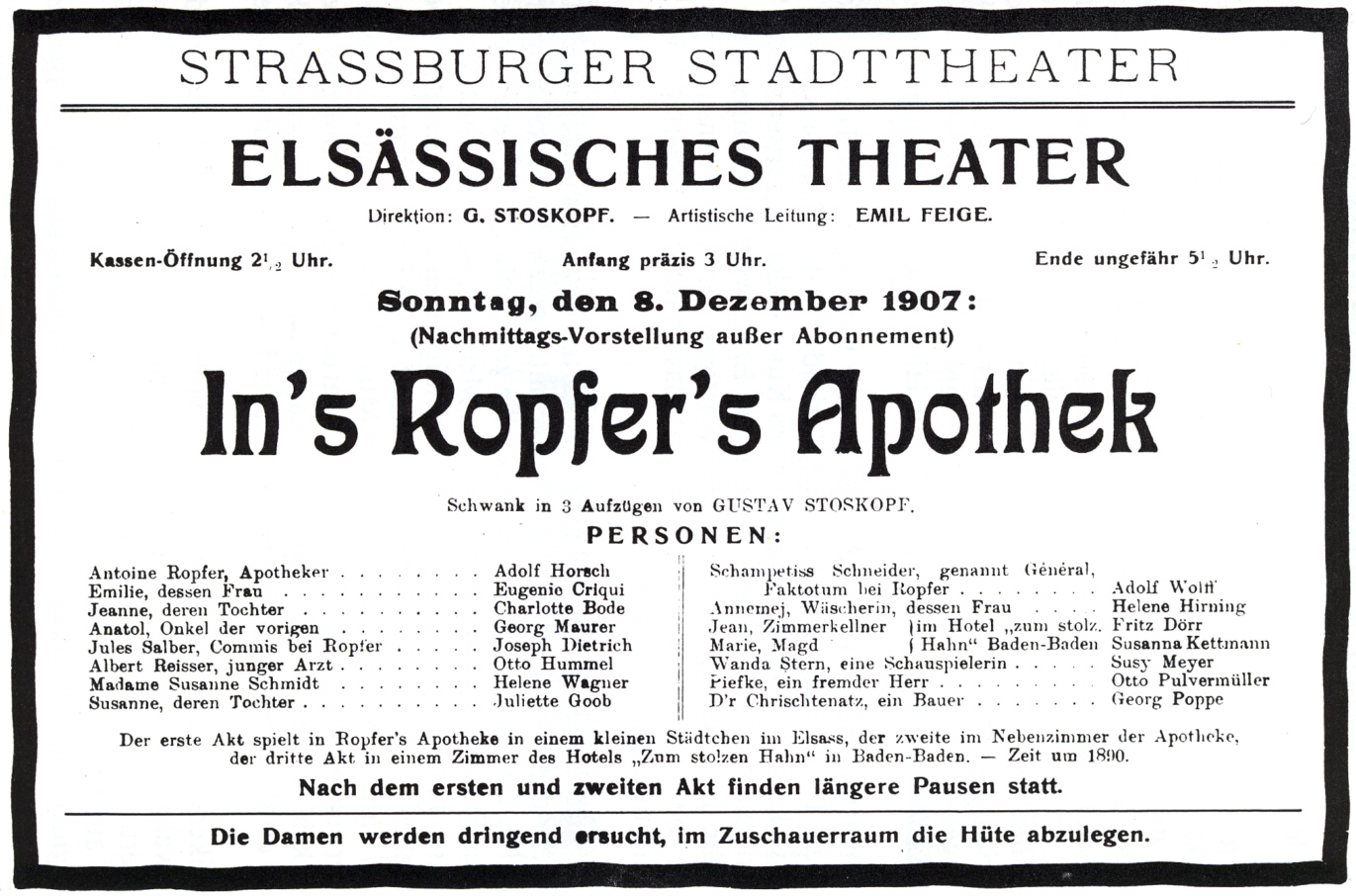
Poster for a 1907 performance of a Stoskopf play
