= Peter the Chanter =

Roman Catholic theologian

Peter the Chanter (died 1197), also known as Peter Cantor or by his Latin name Petrus Cantor, was a French Roman Catholic theologian. He received his education at Rheims, and later moved on to Paris, where, in 1183, he became Chanter (hence his name) and chief canon at Notre-Dame. Charters show Petrus Cantor as a man active in hearing cases, witnessing documents and participating in the business of the chapter of Notre Dame. Petrus was elected dean at Reims in 1196, but died in the following year in the Longpont Abbey, some time after 29 January 1197. He produced many theological works dealing with topics such as sacraments, canon law, and the equality of men in the absence of sin. His work reflects Scholastic perspectives. Peter the Chanter was an influential voice in contemporary theology and his teachings are reflective of the evolving perspectives within the Church of the late 12th century and early 13th century.

== Law ==
=== Trial By Ordeal ===
Prior to Lateran Council IV trial by ordeal was used in the adjudication of cases in many jurisdictions throughout Europe. Trial by ordeal could occur in a few ways, one of which was trial by hot iron. In this procedure the accused would be charged with carrying a glowing hot iron. After this concluded the burned hands would be bandaged and if they did not fester then the accused was declared innocent. The individual overseeing this process was often a member of the clergy. The clergy members in charge of the ordeal held a great amount of power over the results due to their ability to interpret the failure or success of the defendant. The trial by ordeal was a major topic of conversation in 12th century theology influencing theologians like Peter Chanter to argue against the trial by ordeal which was something effectively ended by the Fourth Lateran Council. Much of Peter the Chanter's teachings appear to be antithetical to the practice of the ordeal. Peter the Chanter argued that all men possess natural equality as a result of having equal reason and, because of that, they are free from the power of others in the absence of wrongdoing. Given the subjectivity with which clergy members could interpret the results of the ordeal, it provided them the opportunity to exercise power over defendants without a proof of wrongdoing.

Some scholars have argued that religious concerns were heavily involved throughout the legal processes of Medieval Europe beyond the involvement of the clergy. People were worried about the implications their judgement could have on their soul. If they judged incorrectly or mercilessly they worried that God may respond in kind with eternal damnation. This is a major topic of concern within 12th century theology influencing theologians like Peter Chanter to argue against the trial by ordeal which was something effectively ended by the Fourth Lateran Council. This intertwining of religion and secular justice was a topic Peter wrote extensively about even beyond the context of the ordeal. Peter the Chanter is a major source of clarification that the secular practices to address wrongdoing did not all address wrong done unto God and therefore only penance would affect an individual's eternal standing.

== Bibliography ==
=== Distinctiones Abel ===
Distinctiones Abel is a distinctions genre text completed by Peter the Chanter sometime between 1178 and 1188, prior to working on Verbum and Sacramentis. The distinctions genre was utilized by other theologians of the time such as Peter Cornwall who wrote Patheologus within a decade of Peter the Chanter. This genre typically involves the author distinguishing the different meanings and uses of various religious terms. What is unique to Peter the Chanter's Distinctiones Abel is its alphabetical organization which is reflective of the organization occurring in late 12th century Europe. This alphabetization also points to the work's intended use as a reference manual for clerics, which is further evidenced by the assumptions made of the readers' knowledge. For example, Peter will quote the start of Psalms and assume the reader can fill in the rest.

=== Summa de Sacramentis et Animae Consiliis ===
Summa de Sacramentis et Animae Consiliis was a scholastic style text based on Peter the Chanter's lectures. It includes writings directly by him as well as input from his students. This can make it difficult to know the accuracy of the arguments recorded or even the author of them. Still, the words in the Summa reflect viewpoints that surrounded the Chanter even if they are not his own. One viewpoint expressed in the Summa de Sacramentis is that due to the hardship Christians face under Islamic rule and the nature of Islamic prayer, Christians who pray in a mosque do not sin. This issue reflects a lack of consensus existing within the theological community regarding certain issues. Other polemics of the Chanter's time would have argued the exact opposite regarding Christian prayer in mosques. By addressing unsettled questions pertinent to 12th century Christendom, Peter the Chanter serves as a good example of the evolving nature of church doctrines and orthodoxy in the 12th century.

=== Verbum Abbreviatum ===
Likely produced sometime between 1191 and 1192, the Verbum Abbreviatum is the text in which Peter argues for the end of trial by ordeal as a form of judgement. He supports his argument primarily through stories demonstrating the flaws in looking to the divine as a means of proof. For example, Peter tells an anecdote in which Reims had been experiencing a drought. In an attempt to have to appeal to God for rain the Christians take relics out of the churches and into the streets. After some time a Jewish rabbi proposes a wager to the master of Rheims that they will use their Torahs to make it rain or else convert to Christianity. The master rejects this before explaining the risk that the Jews use magic to elicit rain and that people loose faith in God is too great to accept such a wager. This anecdote is just one example of how Peter the Chanter attempted to illustrate the problematic nature of appealing to the divine for naturalistic signs of their will, the very appeal required by the ordeal.
