= Paul Guérin =

French encyclopaedist

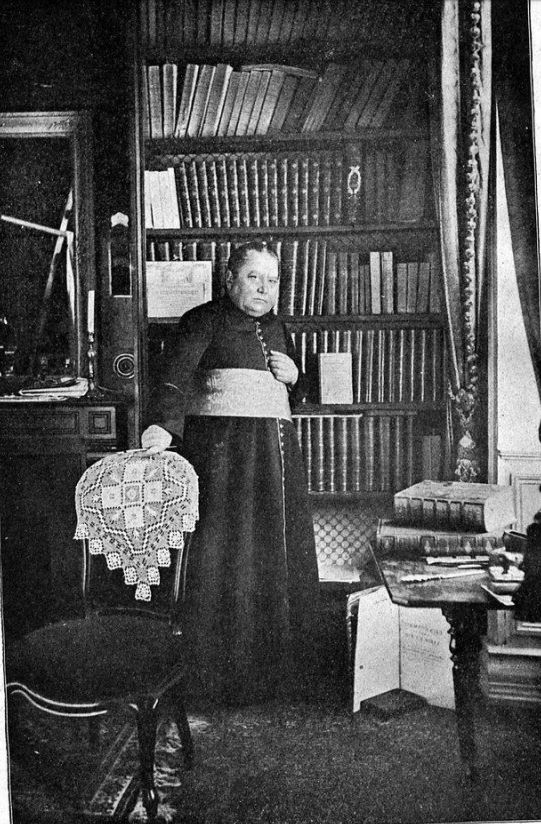
- Born: 8 March 1830; Buzançais
- Died: 23 June 1908 (aged 78); Lanzac, hamlet of Cieurac
- Occupations: Priest, writer

Paul Guérin (French pronunciation: [pɔl ɡeʁɛ̃]; 8 March 1830 – 23 June 1908) was a French priest, professor of philosophy, writer and encyclopedist. He was gifted as a compiler, and is best known for being the author of the series Les Petits Bollandistes: vie des saints, with fifteen volumes (1866–1869) that were republished several times.

== Biography ==
Paul Guérin was born in Buzançais to parents with modest income. He studied in Buzancais at the municipal superior school. In 1842 he entered the minor seminary in Saint-Gaultier, then, around 1849, the major seminary of Bourges. At the end of his studies he returned to Saint-Gaultier as a fourth grade teacher. He was then appointed to the Saint-Dizier college, where he taught for 13 years. At the same time as his teaching, he wrote and translated foreign works: for example, in 1857, Paradise Lost by John Milton. In 1858–1859 he published, by subscription, 4 volumes of Giry's Vie des saints.

== Dictionary of dictionaries ==
Paul Guérin edited and issued, under his secular name, the six volumes of the Dictionnaire des dictionnaires. Lettres, sciences, arts, encyclopédie universelle (1884–1890), with a revised edition in 1892, to which an important Illustrated Supplement was added in 1895.

As its title indicated, this work aimed to bring together “the substance of all the dictionaries [...] the summary of human knowledge". The author announced that writing the articles had been entrusted "to special men, both scholars and popularizers". In fact, Paul Guérin surrounded himself with brilliant specialists, such as Camille Saint-Saëns for music and Frédéric Godefroy for lexicography. The editor, Frédéric Loliée, a literary writer, wrote the introduction. The scientific part of the work counterbalances in places the traditional view of religious and theological articles. Instead of limiting itself, like its predecessors, to the forms in use in France, this dictionary opens up the description of the French language to the dialects of Belgium, French-speaking Switzerland and particularly Quebec.

Biographies of authors and important articles were accompanied by a bibliography.

In spite of these qualities, the new encyclopedia faced competition from La Grande Encyclopédie, launched in 1886 by Marcellin Berthelot, and above all the Grand dictionnaire universel du XIXe siècle published by Pierre Larousse. Unable to dominate the market, the company had to reduce its ambitions and each new volume of the encyclopedia became a little smaller than the previous one.

Later dictionaries and encyclopedias often reproduced content from earlier compilations, particularly the Dictionnaire des dictionnaires, as noted by Alain Rey. He observed that twentieth-century encyclopedias frequently reused material from this work, originally produced under Prothonotary Guérin, without consistently acknowledging its source.

Driven into bankruptcy and then into breach of trust to finance his dictionary, Guérin was sentenced to prison and went into hiding at the end of his life in the Lot department.

== Publications ==
- Vie des saints d'après Lipoman, Surius, Ribadeneira et autres auteurs, vol. 1–4, 1858–1860
- Les Petits Bollandistes : vie des Saints, vol. 1–15, 1866–1869
- Les petits bollandistes; vies des saints de l'Ancien et du Nouveau Testament, des martyrs, des pères, des auteurs sacrés et ecclésiastiques ... notices sur les congrégations et les ordres religieux, histoire des reliques, des pèlerinages, des dévotions populaires, des monuments dus à la piété ... d'après le père Giry, dont le travail, pour les vies qu'il a traitées, forme le fond de cet ouvrage, les grands bollandistes qui ont été de nouveau intégralement analysés, Surius, Ribadeneira, Godescard, Baillet, les hagiologies et les propres de chaque diocèse tant de France que de l'étranger, et les travaux, soit archéologiques, soit hagiographiques, les plus récents (7th edition considerably expanded ed.), Paris: Bloud et Barral, 1888
- Dictionnaire des dictionnaires : lettres, sciences, arts, encyclopédie universelle, Librairie des imprimeries réunies, Motteroz, 1884–1892 Vol 1, 2, 3, 4, 5, 6 and supplement,
- Nouveau dictionnaire classique, 1887
- Mgr Paul Guérin et Gaspard Bovier-Lapierre, ed. (1894–1906), Nouveau dictionnaire universel illustré contenant : langue française - histoire, biographie, géographie, sciences et arts, sciences et arts (New revised edition, augmented, containing in two appendices the spelling simplifications authorized by the French Academy 1901 and 1905 ed.)

== Sources ==
- Cormier, Monique Catherine; Boulanger, Jean-Claude; Francoeur, Aline (2003), Les dictionnaires Le Robert : genèse et évolution (in French), PUM
- Dictionnaire des dictionnaires (Avertissement)
- Fèvre, Justin (1829–1907), Mgr Paul Guérin, camérier du pape et protonotaire apostolique (in French), Paris: A. Savaète, pp. 88 portrait
- Gaudin, François (2005), "Lettre sur la lexicographie militante", in Henri Béjoint; François Maniez (eds.), De la mesure dans les termes : hommage à Philippe Thoiron (in French), Presses Universitaires de Lyon
- Guérin, Paul (1880), Les Petits Bollandistes: vie des Saints (in French) (7 ed.), Bloud et Barral
- Laplanche, François, ed. (1996), Les Sciences religieuses, Dictionnaire du monde religieux dans la France contemporaine (in French), Paris: Éditions Beauchesne, ISBN 978-2-7010-1341-1
- Pruvost, Jean (2013), "Du Dictionnaire des dictionnaires à L'Encyclopédie universelle du XXe siècle", F. Gaudin (dir) La lexicographie militante (in French), Paris: Champion
- Rey, Alain (2011), Dictionnaire amoureux des dictionnaires (in French), Paris: Plon, p. 1002
