= Paul Kazuhiro Mori =

Japanese Roman Catholic bishop (1938–2023)

Paul Kazuhiro Mori was a Japanese Roman Catholic prelate. He was the auxiliary bishop of Tokyo from 1985 to 2000. He was born in Yokohama on 10 December 1938 and was ordained in 1967. He retired in 2000 and died on 2 September 2023 at the age of 84.
