= Diocese of Créteil =

Latin Catholic ecclesiastical territory in France

Coordinates: 48.7897°N 2.44416°E

Diocese of Créteil Dioecesis Christoliensis Diocèse de Créteil

Catholic
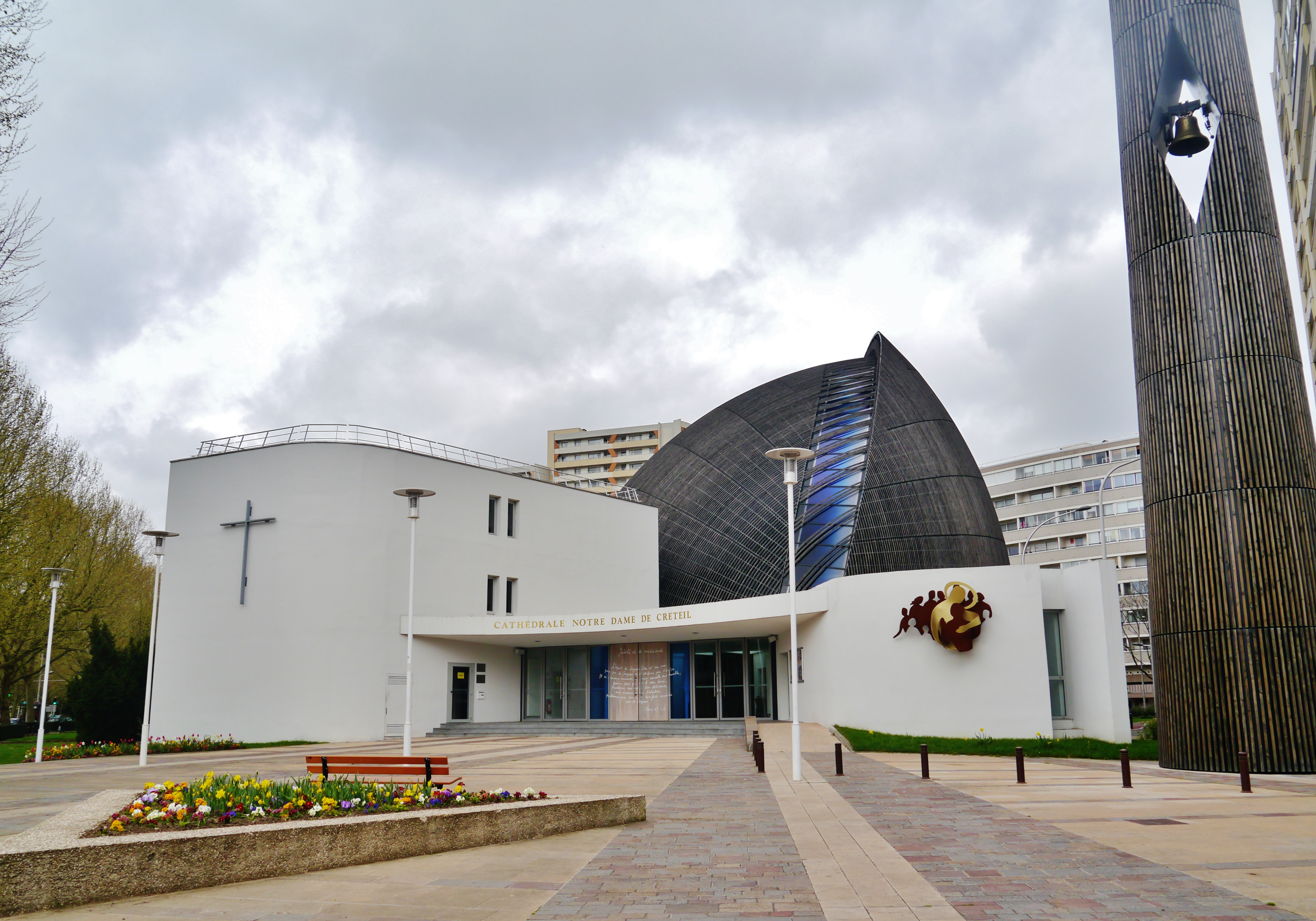
- Cathedral of Our Lady, Créteil

Location
- Country: France
- Ecclesiastical province: Paris
- Metropolitan: Archdiocese of Paris

Statistics
- Area: 245 km^{2} (95 sq mi)
- Population: Total; Catholics: (as of 2021); 1,396,913 (est.); 817,750 (est.) (58.5%)
- Parishes: 385

Information
- Denomination: Catholic Church
- Sui iuris church: Latin Church
- Rite: Roman Rite
- Established: 9 October 1966
- Cathedral: Cathedral of Notre Dame in Créteil
- Secular priests: 104 (Diocesan); 46 (Religious Orders); 46 Permanent Deacons

Current leadership
- Pope: Leo XIV
- Bishop: Dominique Blanchet
- Metropolitan Archbishop: Laurent Ulrich
- Bishops emeritus: Michel Santier

Map

Website
- Website of the Diocese of Créteil (in French)

The Diocese of Créteil (Latin: Dioecesis Christoliensis; French: Diocèse de Créteil) is a Latin Church ecclesiastical territory or diocese of the Catholic Church in France. Erected in 1966 from a subdivision of the Archdiocese of Paris and the Diocese of Versailles, the Diocese of Créteil remains a suffragan diocese in the ecclesiastical province of the metropolitan Archdiocese of Paris.

== Ordinaries ==
- Robert Marie-Joseph François de Provenchères (9 October 1966 – 13 August 1981)
- François-Victor-Marie Frétellière, P.S.S. (13 August 1981 – 3 May 1997)
- Daniel Labille (25 March 1998 – 4 September 2007)
- Michel Santier (4 September 2007 – 9 January 2021)
- Dominique Blanchet (9 January 2021 – present)

== See also ==
- Catholic Church in France
