= Sixtus of Reims =

Saint Sixtus of Reims
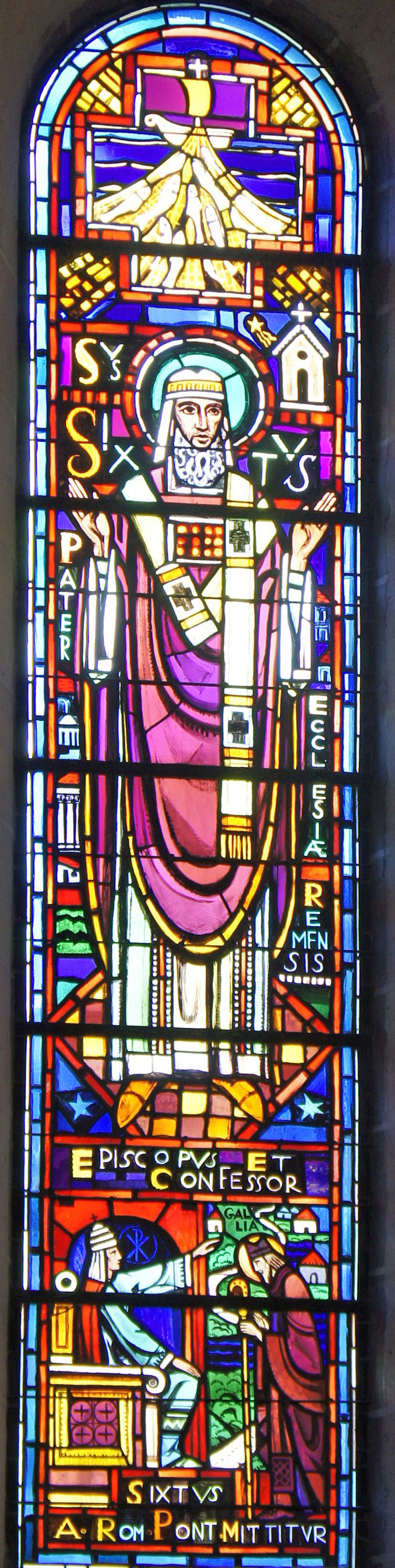
- Sixtus in a stained glass window

Bishop
- Died: ~300 AD
- Venerated in: Roman Catholic Church; Eastern Orthodox Church
- Feast: September 1

Saint Sixtus of Reims (French: Sixte de Reims) (died c. 300) is considered the first bishop of Reims. According to Hincmar, a 9th-century archbishop of Reims, Sixtus was sent from Rome by Pope Sixtus II to Gaul to assist in Christianizing the region. Another tradition makes him, anachronistically, the disciple of Saint Peter. According to tradition, Sixtus of Reims, along with his companion St. Sinicius (Sinice), established the Christian sees of Reims and Soissons. Sinicius would later succeed Sixtus as bishop of Reims. According to one source, “it would appear that Sixtus did not die as a martyr, despite the severity of the persecution during the era.”
