= Longpont =

- Commune
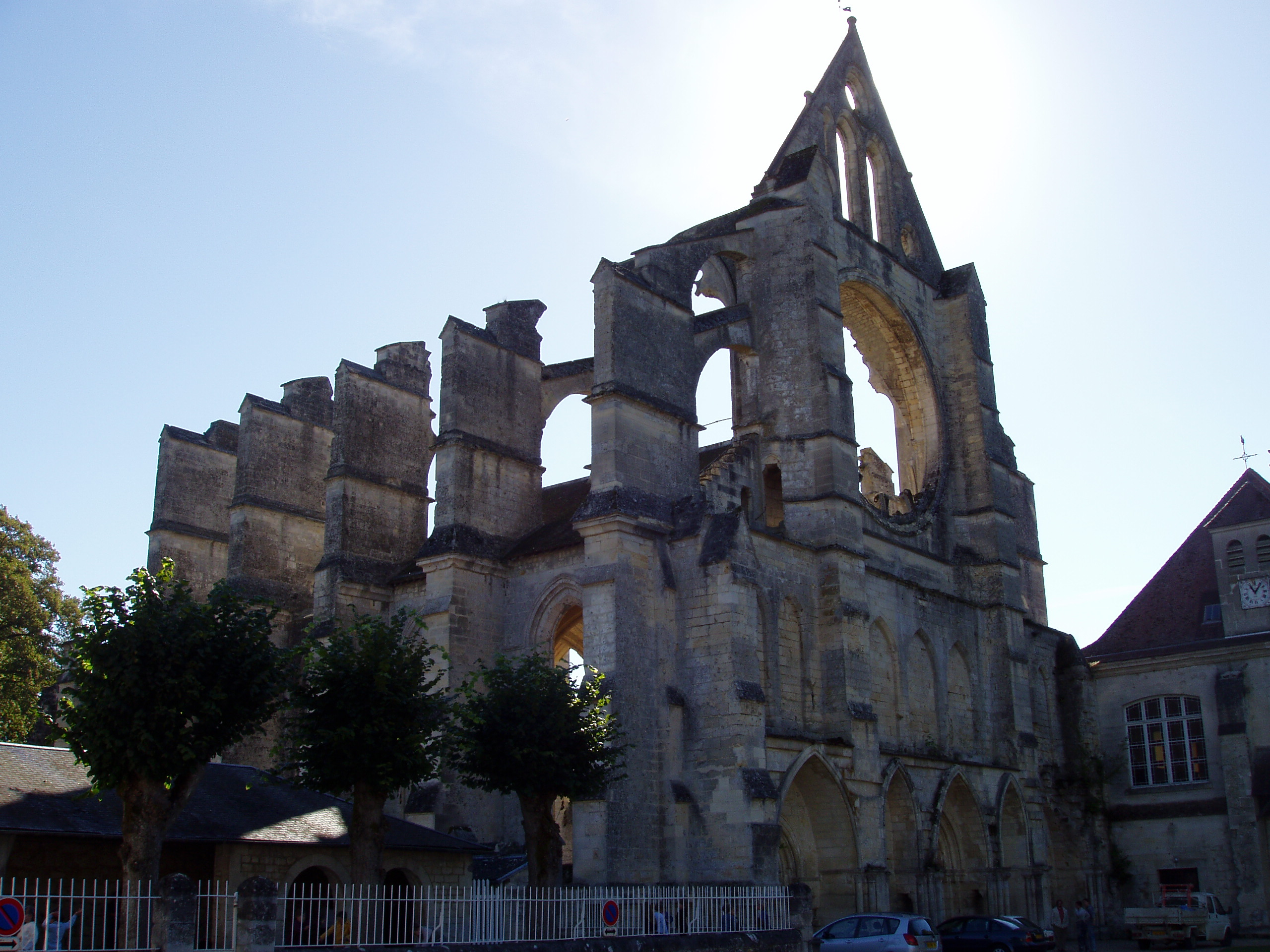
- Ruins of the abbey

- Coat of arms
- Location of Longpont
- Location within France Location within Hauts-de-France
- Coordinates: 49°16′25″N 3°13′17″E
- Country: France
- Region: Hauts-de-France
- Department: Aisne
- Arrondissement: Soissons
- Canton: Villers-Cotterêts

Government
  - Mayor (2026–32): Gilles Davalan
- Area^{1}: 10.94 km^{2} (4.22 sq mi)
- Elevation: 85 m (279 ft)
- Highest elevation: 152 m (499 ft)
- Lowest elevation: 77 m (253 ft)
- Population (2023): 249
  - Density: 22.8/km^{2} (58.9/sq mi)
- Time zone: UTC+01:00 (CET)
  - Summer (DST): UTC+02:00 (CEST)
- INSEE/Postal code: 02438 /02600
- ^{1} French Land Register data, which excludes lakes, ponds, glaciers > 1 km^{2} (0.386 sq mi or 247 acres) and river estuaries.

Longpont (French pronunciation: [lɔ̃pɔ̃]) is a commune in the Aisne department in Hauts-de-France in northern France. It is around 13 km southwest of Soissons, and around 75 km northeast of Paris. The former Longpont Abbey is situated in the commune.

On 8 January 2015 the town was locked down in the search for the suspects in the Charlie Hebdo shooting.

== History ==
=== Foundation and development of the abbey ===
The history of Longpont is closely associated with the foundation of Notre-Dame Abbey, a Cistercian monastery established in the early 12th century. The abbey was founded in 1131–1132 through the initiative of Joscelin de Vierzy, Bishop of Soissons, who requested the assistance of Bernard of Clairvaux. A group of twelve Cistercian monks was sent to establish the community at Longpont. The foundation received support from local landowners and developed into an important religious and agricultural centre in the region.

The original monastic buildings were progressively replaced by larger structures. Construction of the Gothic abbey church began in the early 13th century. On 24 October 1227, the church was consecrated in the presence of King Louis IX of France and Blanche of Castile. The abbey church was comparable in size to Soissons Cathedral and became one of the principal Cistercian establishments in the region.

During the Middle Ages and the early modern period, the abbey was affected by several military conflicts. It was plundered in 1356, 1414 and 1568, during the Hundred Years' War and the French Wars of Religion. The buildings underwent subsequent repairs and reconstruction.

In 1724, a fire destroyed a substantial part of the monastic buildings. Reconstruction followed, including alterations to the conventual buildings and the construction of new architectural features.

=== French Revolution ===
During the French Revolution, the abbey was declared national property and sold. The monastic community came to an end, and parts of the abbey complex, including the church and the eastern buildings, were dismantled. Their stone was reused in construction projects in the surrounding area. Other buildings were retained and subsequently passed into private ownership. In 1804, the property was acquired by the Montesquiou family.

=== First World War ===
During the First World War, Longpont was affected by military operations in the Soissons region. In 1918, German troops set fire to buildings belonging to the former abbey, while the abbey church was damaged by bombing. Parts of the complex were subsequently reconstructed between 1920 and 1930. The damage and destruction of 1918 were documented in historical studies of the abbey.

=== Second World War ===
During the Second World War, the former abbey at Longpont was again affected by military operations. In 1940, the abbey buildings sustained damage from bombardments.

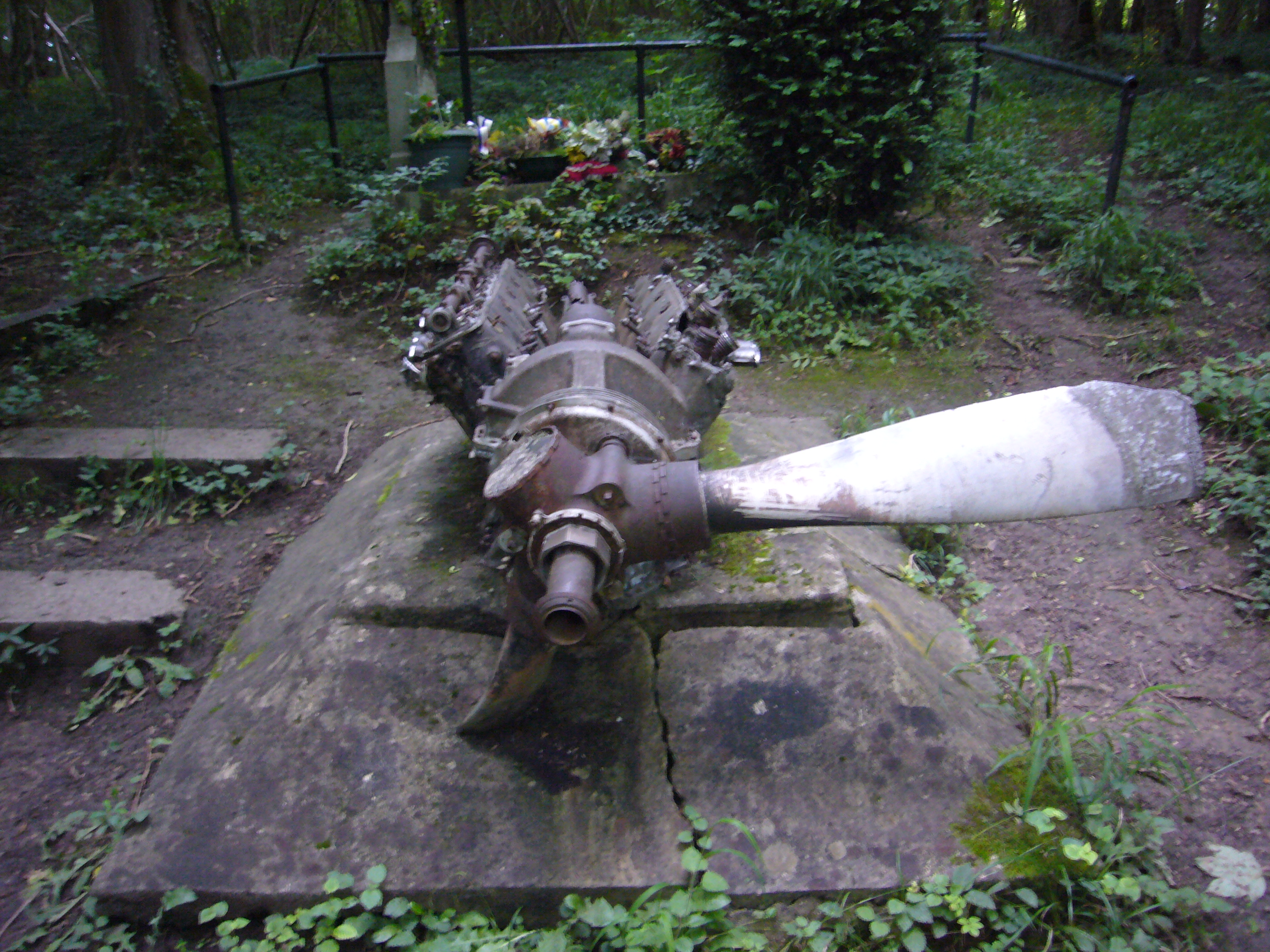
Monument in Longpont (Aisne) where a French pilot Lieutenant André Monty was shot down in June 1940 by three Bf 109s and buried among his MS.406 remains.

On 8 June 1940, during an aerial engagement, French fighter pilot Lieutenant André Monty was killed near Longpont. His aircraft crashed in the area, where he was initially buried. His tomb is located along the D17 road in the commune and is recorded in the French Ministry of Culture's heritage inventory.

=== Restoration and preservation ===
Following the two world wars, restoration work was undertaken on the surviving buildings of the former abbey. The complex underwent further conservation work during the 20th century. The remaining medieval structures, together with later architectural additions, form an important part of Longpont's architectural heritage.

== Population ==
Historical population
Year	Pop.	±% p.a.
1968	311	—
1975	272	−1.90%
1982	306	+1.70%
1990	298	−0.33%
1999	294	−0.15%
2007	282	−0.52%
2012	292	+0.70%
2017	262	−2.14%
2023	249	−0.84%
Source: INSEE

== See also ==
- List of medieval bridges in France
- Communes of the Aisne department
- Longpont Abbey
- Montesquieu
- Chaudun
- Corcy
- Louâtre
- Montgobert
- Saint-Pierre-Aigle
- Vierzy
- Villers-Hélon
