= Court of Auditors (France) =

Abolished sovereign courts of France specialising in financial affairs

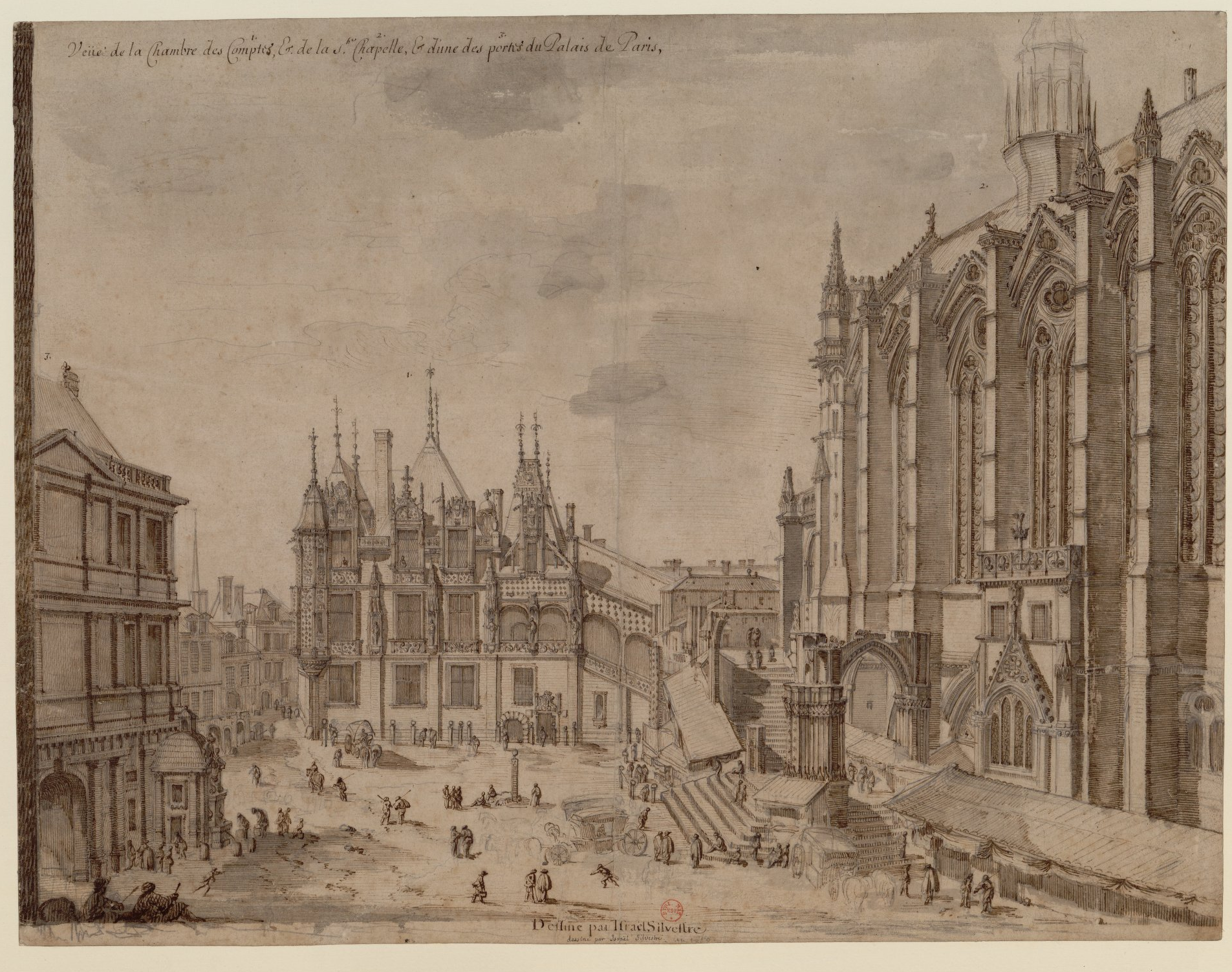
Court of Accounts in Paris.

Under the French monarchy, the Courts of Accounts (French: chambres des comptes, pronounced [ʃɑ̃bʁ de kɔ̃t]) were sovereign courts specialising in financial affairs. The Court of Accounts in Paris was the oldest and the forerunner of today's French Court of Audit. They oversaw public spending, handled finances, protected crown estates, audited the accounts of crown officials, and adjudicated any related matters of law.

== Court in Paris ==
=== Early history ===
To oversee the Kingdom's revenues and expenditure, the French King first relied solely on his King's Court or Curia Regis, court officials who assisted him in governing. However, by the mid-12th century, the Crown entrusted its finances to the Knights Templar, who maintained a banking establishment in Paris. The royal Treasury was henceforth organized like a bank and salaries and revenues were transferred between accounts. Royal accounting officers in the field, who sent revenues to the Temple, were audited by the King's Court, which had special clerks assigned to work at the Temple. These financial specialists came to be called the Curia in Compotis and sat in special sessions of the King's Court for dealing with financial business. From 1297, accounts were audited twice yearly after Midsummer Day (24 June) and Christmas. In time, what was once a simple Exchequer of Receipts developed into a central auditing agency, branched off, and eventually specialized into a full-time court.

In 1256, Saint Louis issued a decree ordering all mayors, burgesses, and town councilmen to appear before the King's sovereign auditors of the Exchequer (French gens des comptes) in Paris to render their final accounting. The King's Court's general secretariat had members who specialized in finance and accountancy and could receive accounts. A number of Barons (maîtres lais) were commissioned to sit as the King's Exchequer (comptes du Roi).

In or around 1303, the Paris Court of Accounts was established in the Palais de la Cité where it remained until the French Revolution. Its auditors were responsible for overseeing revenue from Crown estates and checking public spending. It audited the Royal Household, inspectors, royal commissioners, provosts, and lower court justices. In 1307, the Philip IV definitively removed royal funds from the Temple and placed them in the fortress of the Louvre. Thereafter, the financial specialists received accounts for audit in a room of the royal palace that became known as the Camera compotorum or Chambre des comptes, and they began to be collectively identified under the same name, although still only a subcommittee within the King's Court, consisting of about sixteen people.

The Vivier-en-Brie Ordinance of 1320, issued by Philip V, required the Chambre to audit finances, judge cases arising from accountancy, and maintain registers of financial documents; it also laid out the basic composition of financial courts: three (later four) cleric masters of accounts (maîtres-clercs) to act as chief auditors and three lay Barons (maîtres-lais familiers du Roi) empowered to hear and adjudge ("oyer and terminer") audit accounts. They were assisted by eleven clerks (petis clercs, later clercs des comptes) who acted as auditors of the prests. This complement grew by 50% in the next two decades but was reduced to seven masters and twelve clerks in 1346. The office of churchman Chief Baron (président) was created by the Ordinance of 1381, and a second lay Chief Baron was appointed in 1400. Clerks of court were eventually added to the Court's composition. Examiners (correcteurs) were created to assist the Barons (maitres). Other court officers (conseillers) appointed by the King were created to act alongside the puisne Barons (maîtres ordinaires). Lastly, the Ordinance of 26 February 1464 named the Court of Accounts as the "sovereign, primary, supreme, and sole court of last resort in all things financial".

While gaining in stability in the later 14th century, the Court lost its central role in royal finances. First, currency was moved to a separate body (Chambre des monnaies), then the increasingly regular "extraordinary" taxes (aide, tallage, gabelle) became the responsibility of the généraux of the Cour des aides (created in 1390). The Crown's domainal revenues, still retained by the Court of Accounts, fell in importance and value. By 1400, the Court's role had been much reduced. However, with the gradual enlargement of the Realm through conquest, the need for the Court remained secure.

== In the Provinces ==
The oldest provincial Court of Accounts was in Dauphiné and established in 1368. Other courts sprang up in Normandy (1465), Provence, Burgundy, Nantes in Brittany, Navarre (1527), Languedoc and Roussillon, and the cities of Nancy, Metz and Bar-le-Duc.

== Decline and abolition ==
Toward the end of the French monarchy and excluding the Paris Court of Accounts, out of 12 other regional courts of accounts, some (merged into the Cours des aides) continued to exercise as financial courts presiding over tax and estate cases. Some sovereign courts of account were raised from grand feudal estates also existing in certain provinces, and did not therefore form a cohesive whole. It was not until the French Revolution that the Courts of Accounts would be abolished between 17 and 29 September 1791.

== Court Officers and Staff ==
At any given time, a Court of Accounts may have included any of a number of officers:

- premier président – Chief Baron
- président (de chambre) – Presiding Baron
- maître des comptes (later conseiller maître) – puisne or ordinary Baron
- auditeur des comptes (later conseiller auditeur) – auditor (later Auditor of the Prests)
- correcteur des comptes (later conseiller correcteur) – examiner of accounts
- conseiller contrôleur des restes – comptroller
- conseiller sécrétaire – judicial secretary
- sécrétaire du roi – Secretary to the King
- procureur du roi (later procureur général) – King's attorney-general
- avocat général – King's deputy attorney
- substitut – King's solicitor-general
- greffier en chef – Chief Clerk of Court
- greffier au plumitif – Clerk of the Dockets
- greffier à la peau – Clerk of the Pipe, or Ingrosser of the Great Roll
- sous-greffier – deputy clerk of court
- garde des livres – Clerk of the Pells (records officer)
- receveur de gages – Teller of the Receipt
- receveur des amendes – Chirographer of Fines
- commis à doubler les comptes – Comptroller of the Pipe (copyist; made a counter-roll or "duplicates")
- chevalier d'honneur – Usher
- premier huissier – Constable
- huissier – marshall

== Bibliography ==
- Raynaud, Jean (1988). La Cour des comptes. Paris: Presses Universitaires de France (coll. Que sais-je ?). (in French)
- Lemonde, Anne (2002). Le temps des libertés en Dauphiné: L'intégration d'une principauté à la couronne de France (1349–1408). Grenoble: Presses Universitaires de Grenoble (coll. La Pierre et l'Écrit). (in French)
- Laussat, M. le baron de (1871). Société des Sciences, Lettres et Arts de Pau (ed.). "Extraits des Registres de la Chambre des Comptes de Pau (XVIe et XVIIe siècles.)" [Extracts from the Registers of the Chambre des Comptes of Pau (16th and 17th Centuries.)] (application/txt/pdf). Bulletin de la Société des Sciences, Lettres et Arts de Pau (in French). Vol. II série–1. Pau, Pyrénées-Atlantiques: Léon Ribaut, Librairie de la Société. pp. 60–64, 83–96, 127–144, 163–192, 254–264.
