= List of cathedrals in France =

This is a list of cathedrals in France and in the French overseas departments, territories and collectivities, including both actual and former diocesan cathedrals (seats of bishops). Almost all cathedrals in France are Roman Catholic, but any non-Roman Catholic cathedrals are listed here as well.

The list is intended to be complete as far as current cathedrals and co-cathedrals are concerned. It is not yet an exhaustive list of former cathedrals, although it includes most of them.

A number of large churches in France are known as "cathedral" as a mark of distinction or historical importance but have never been the seats of bishops. These are mostly not included here.

== Roman Catholic cathedrals ==
Cathedral	Archdiocese or Diocese	Location	Dedication	Notes	Image
Agde Cathedral; Cathédrale Saint-Étienne d'Agde	Montpellier	Agde	Saint Stephen	former cathedral (bishopric suppressed in 1801)	
Agen Cathedral; Cathédrale Saint-Caprais d'Agen	Agen	Agen	Saint Caprasius	cathedral; World Heritage Site	
Aire Cathedral; Cathédrale Saint-Jean-Baptiste d'Aire	Aire et Dax	Aire-sur-l'Adour	Saint John the Baptist	cathedral	
Aix Cathedral; Cathédrale Saint-Sauveur d'Aix	Aix	Aix-en-Provence	Holy Saviour	cathedral, minor basilica	
Ajaccio Cathedral; Cathédrale Notre-Dame-de-l'Assomption d'Ajaccio	Ajaccio	Ajaccio	Assumption of the Blessed Virgin Mary	cathedral	
Albi Cathedral; Cathédrale Sainte-Cécile d'Albi	Albi	Albi	Saint Cecilia	cathedral, minor basilica	
Alès Cathedral; Cathédrale Saint-Jean-Baptiste d'Alès	Nîmes	Alès	Saint John the Baptist	former cathedral (bishopric suppressed in 1801)	
Alet Cathedral; Cathédrale Notre-Dame d'Alet	Carcassonne et Narbonne	Alet-les-Bains	Blessed Virgin Mary	former cathedral ruins (ruined in 1577 and finally demolished in 1776; bishopric suppressed in 1801)	
Aleth Cathedral; Cathédrale Saint-Pierre d'Aleth	Rennes	Saint-Servan	Saint Peter	former cathedral ruins (replaced by Saint-Malo Cathedral in 1146 and destroyed in 1255)	
Amiens Cathedral; Cathédrale Notre-Dame d'Amiens	Amiens	Amiens	Blessed Virgin Mary	cathedral, minor basilica; World Heritage Site	
Angers Cathedral; Cathédrale Saint-Maurice d'Angers	Angers	Angers	Saint Maurice	cathedral	
Angoulême Cathedral; Cathédrale Saint-Pierre d'Angoulême	Angoulême	Angoulême	Saint Peter	cathedral	
Annecy Cathedral; Cathédrale Saint-Pierre d'Annecy	Annecy	Annecy	Saint Peter	cathedral	
Antibes Cathedral; Cathédrale Notre-Dame-de-la-Platea d'Antibes	Nice	Antibes	Blessed Virgin Mary; Notre-Dame de la Platéa	former cathedral (bishopric suppressed in 1801)	
Apt Cathedral; Cathédrale Sainte-Anne d'Apt	Avignon	Apt	Saint Ann	former cathedral (bishopric suppressed in 1801)	
Arles Cathedral, now Church of St. Trophime, Arles; Cathédrale Saint-Trophime d'Arles	Aix	Arles	Saint Trophimus	former cathedral (archbishopric suppressed in 1822); minor basilica	
Arras Cathedral; Cathédrale Notre-Dame-et-Saint-Vaast d'Arras	Arras	Arras	Blessed Virgin Mary and Saint Vedast	cathedral, minor basilica	
Auch Cathedral; Cathédrale Sainte-Marie d'Auch	Auch	Auch	Saint Mary	cathedral, minor basilica; World Heritage Site	
Autun Cathedral; Cathédrale Saint-Lazare d'Autun	Autun	Autun	Saint Lazarus of Aix	cathedral (built in the 12th century), minor basilica	
Old Autun Cathedral; Cathedrale Saint-Nazaire d'Autun	Autun	Autun	Saint Nazarius	former cathedral, 5th-12th centuries	
Auxerre Cathedral; Cathédrale Saint-Étienne d'Auxerre	Sens and Auxerre	Auxerre	Saint Stephen	former cathedral (bishopric suppressed in 1821)	
Avignon Cathedral; Cathédrale Notre-Dame-des-Doms d'Avignon	Avignon	Avignon	Blessed Virgin Mary; Notre-Dame-des-Doms	cathedral, minor basilica	
Avranches Cathedral; Cathédrale Saint-André d'Avranches	Coutances	Avranches	Saint Andrew	former cathedral, almost no remains (destroyed during the French Revolution; bishopric suppressed in 1801)	
Bastia Cathedral; Pro-cathédrale Sainte-Marie de Bastia	Ajaccio	Bastia	Saint Mary	former pro-cathedral (bishopric suppressed in 1801)	
Bayeux Cathedral; Cathédrale Notre-Dame de Bayeux	Bayeux	Bayeux	Blessed Virgin Mary	cathedral	
Bayonne Cathedral; Cathédrale Sainte-Marie de Bayonne	Bayonne	Bayonne	Saint Mary	cathedral	
Bazas Cathedral; Cathédrale Saint-Jean-Baptiste de Bazas	Bordeaux	Bazas	Saint John the Baptist	former cathedral (bishopric suppressed in 1801); World Heritage Site	
Beauvais Cathedral; Cathédrale Saint-Pierre de Beauvais	Beauvais	Beauvais	Saint Peter	cathedral	
Belfort Cathedral; Cathédrale Saint-Christophe de Belfort	Belfort-Montbéliard	Belfort	Saint Christopher	cathedral	
Belley Cathedral; Cathédrale Saint-Jean de Belley	Belley-Ars	Belley	Saint John the Baptist	cathedral	
Besançon Cathedral; Cathédrale Saint-Jean de Besançon	Besançon	Besançon	Saint John the Evangelist	cathedral, minor basilica	
Béziers Cathedral; Cathédrale Saint-Nazaire-et-Saint-Celse de Béziers	Montpellier	Béziers	Saints Nazarius and Celsus	former cathedral (bishopric suppressed in 1801)	
Blois Cathedral; Cathédrale Saint-Louis de Blois	Blois	Blois	Saint Louis	cathedral	
Bordeaux Cathedral; Cathédrale Saint-André de Bordeaux	Bordeaux	Bordeaux	Saint Andrew	cathedral; World Heritage Site	
Boulogne Cathedral; Cathédrale Notre-Dame de Boulogne	Arras	Boulogne-sur-Mer	Blessed Virgin Mary	former cathedral (bishopric suppressed in 1801)	
Bourg-en-Bresse Cathedral; Concathédrale Notre-Dame-de-l'Annonciation de Bourg-en-Bresse	Belley-Ars	Bourg-en-Bresse	Annunciation of the Blessed Virgin Mary	co-cathedral	
Bourges Cathedral; Cathédrale Saint-Étienne de Bourges	Bourges	Bourges	Saint Stephen	cathedral; World Heritage Site	
Cahors Cathedral; Cathédrale Saint-Étienne de Cahors	Cahors	Cahors	Saint Stephen	cathedral; World Heritage Site	
Calvi Cathedral; Cathédrale Saint-Jean-Baptiste de Calvi	Ajaccio	Calvi	Saint John the Baptist	former cathedral (bishopric suppressed in 1801)	
Cambrai Cathedral; Cathédrale Notre-Dame-de-Grâce-et-St-Sépulcre	Cambrai	Cambrai	Our Lady of Grace and the Holy Sepulchre	cathedral (from 1801), former abbey church, minor basilica	
Old Cambrai Cathedral; Vieille Cathédrale de Cambrai	Cambrai	Cambrai	Our Lady of Grace and the Holy Sepulchre	former cathedral, no remains (destroyed during French Revolution)	
Carcassonne Cathedral; Cathédrale Saint-Michel de Carcassonne	Carcassonne et Narbonne	Carcassonne	Saint Michael	cathedral	
Basilica of St. Nazaire and St. Celse, Carcassonne; Basilique Saint-Nazaire-et-Saint-Celse de Carcassonne	Carcassonne et Narbonne	Carcassonne	Saints Nazarius and Celsus	former cathedral, minor basilica	
Carpentras Cathedral; Cathédrale Saint-Siffrein de Carpentras	Avignon	Carpentras	Saint Siffredus	former cathedral (bishopric suppressed in 1801)	
Castres Cathedral; Cathédrale Saint-Benoît de Castres	Albi	Castres	Saint Benedict	former cathedral (bishopric suppressed in 1801)	
Cavaillon Cathedral; Cathédrale Notre-Dame-et-Saint-Véran de Cavaillon	Avignon	Cavaillon	Blessed Virgin Mary; Saint Veranus	former cathedral (bishopric suppressed in 1801)	
Cervione Cathedral; Pro-cathédrale Saint-Erasme de Cervione	Ajaccio	Cervione	Saint Erasmus	former cathedral (bishopric suppressed in 1801)	
Chalon Cathedral; Cathédrale Saint-Vincent de Chalon	Autun	Chalon-sur-Saône	Saint Vincent	former cathedral (bishopric suppressed in 1801)	
Châlons Cathedral; Cathédrale Saint-Étienne de Châlons	Châlons	Châlons-en-Champagne	Saint Stephen	cathedral	
Chambéry Cathedral; Cathédrale Saint-François-de-Sales de Chambéry	Chambéry-Saint-Jean-de Maurienne-Tarentaise	Chambéry	Saint Francis de Sales	cathedral, minor basilica	
Chartres Cathedral; Cathédrale Notre-Dame de Chartres	Chartres	Chartres	Blessed Virgin Mary	cathedral, minor basilica; World Heritage Site	
Choisy Cathedral; Cathédrale Saint-Louis-et-Saint-Nicolas de Choisy	Créteil	Choisy-le-Roi	Saint Louis; Saint Nicholas	former cathedral (1966–87), parish church	
Cimiez Cathedral; Cathédrale Sainte-Marie de Cimiez or Notre-Dame du Château	Nice	Cimiez	Saint Mary	former cathedral ruins (formerly the cathedral of Nice. It was demoted in 1590 and demolished in 1706).	
Clamecy Cathedral; Cathédrale Notre-Dame-de-Bethléem de Clamecy	Autun	Clamecy	Our Lady of Bethlehem	former cathedral (bishopric suppressed in 1801; restored in 1840, but as titular see only); parish church	
Clermont-Ferrand Cathedral; Cathédrale Notre-Dame-de-l'Assomption de Clermont-Ferrand	Clermont	Clermont-Ferrand	Assumption of the Blessed Virgin Mary	cathedral	
Condom Cathedral; Cathédrale Saint-Pierre de Condom	Auch	Condom	Saint Peter	former cathedral (bishopric suppressed in 1822)	
Corbeil Cathedral; Cathédrale Saint-Spire de Corbeil	Évry-Corbeil-Essonnes	Corbeil-Essonnes	Saint Exuperius	co-cathedral (cathedral 1966-95)	
Coutances Cathedral; Cathédrale Notre-Dame de Coutances	Coutances	Coutances	Blessed Virgin Mary	cathedral	
Créteil Cathedral; Cathédrale Notre-Dame de Créteil	Créteil	Créteil	Blessed Virgin Mary	cathedral (from 1987)	
Dax Cathedral; Concathédrale Notre-Dame de Dax	Aire et Dax	Dax	Blessed Virgin Mary	co-cathedral	
Die Cathedral (Cathédrale Notre-Dame de Die)	Valence	Die	Blessed Virgin Mary	former cathedral (bishopric suppressed in 1801)	
Digne Cathedral; Cathédrale Saint-Jérôme de Digne	Digne	Digne-les-Bains	Saint Jerome	cathedral	
Dijon Cathedral; Cathédrale Saint-Bénigne de Dijon	Dijon	Dijon	Saint Benignus	cathedral	
Dol Cathedral; Cathédrale Saint-Samson de Dol	Rennes	Dol-de-Bretagne	Saint Samson	former cathedral (bishopric suppressed in 1801)	
Eauze Cathedral; Cathédrale Saint-Luperc d'Eauze	Auch	Eauze	Saint Luperculus	former cathedral (bishopric suppressed, probably in the 9th century)	
Elne Cathedral; Cathédrale Sainte-Eulalie-et-Sainte-Julie d'Elne	Perpignan-Elne	Elne	Saints Eulalia and Julia	former cathedral (bishopric suppressed in 1601/03)	
Embrun Cathedral; Cathédrale Notre-Dame d'Embrun	Digne	Embrun	Blessed Virgin Mary	former cathedral (archbishopric suppressed in 1801)	
Entrevaux Cathedral; Cathédrale Notre-Dame-de-l'Assomption d'Entrevaux	Digne	Entrevaux	Assumption of the Blessed Virgin Mary	former cathedral of the Diocese of Glandèves (bishopric suppressed in 1801)	
Évreux Cathedral; Cathédrale Notre-Dame d'Évreux	Évreux	Évreux	Blessed Virgin Mary	cathedral	
Évry Cathedral; Cathédrale de la Résurrection d'Évry	Évry-Corbeil-Essonnes	Évry	Resurrection; Saint Corbinian	cathedral (from 1995)	
Forcalquier Cathedral; Concathédrale Notre-Dame-du-Bourguet de Forcalquier	Sisteron	Forcalquier	Blessed Virgin Mary; Notre-Dame-du-Bourguet	former co-cathedral (bishopric suppressed in 1801)	
Fréjus Cathedral; Cathédrale Saint-Léonce de Fréjus (or Cathédrale Saint-Aigulf de Fréjus)	Fréjus-Toulon	Fréjus	Saint Leontius (or Saint Aigulf)	former cathedral	
Gap Cathedral; Cathédrale Notre-Dame-et-Saint-Arnoux de Gap	Gap	Gap	Blessed Virgin Mary; Saint Arnoux	cathedral	
Glandèves Cathedral; Cathédrale Notre-Dame-de-la-Sède de Glandèves	Glandèves	Glandèves	Blessed Virgin Mary; Notre-Dame-de-la-Sède	former cathedral (bishopric transferred to Entrevaux in the 17th century, suppressed in 1801)	
Grasse Cathedral; Cathédrale Notre-Dame-du-Puy de Grasse	Nice	Grasse	Blessed Virgin Mary; Notre-Dame du Puy	former cathedral (bishopric suppressed in 1801)	
Grenoble Cathedral; Cathédrale Notre-Dame de Grenoble	Grenoble-Vienne	Grenoble	Blessed Virgin Mary	cathedral	
Langres Cathedral; Cathédrale Saint-Mammès de Langres	Langres	Langres	Saint Mammes	cathedral	
Laon Cathedral; Cathédrale Notre-Dame de Laon	Soissons	Laon	Blessed Virgin Mary	former cathedral (bishopric suppressed in 1801)	
La Rochelle Cathedral; Cathédrale Saint-Louis de La Rochelle	La Rochelle	La Rochelle	Saint Louis	cathedral	
Church of St. Barthélémy, La Rochelle; Église / Pro-cathédrale Saint-Barthélémy de La Rochelle	La Rochelle	La Rochelle	Saint Bartholomew	former pro-cathedral, sharing premises of parish church	
Laval Cathedral; Cathédrale de la Trinité de Laval	Laval	Laval	Trinity	cathedral	
Lavaur Cathedral; Cathédrale Saint-Alain de Lavaur	Albi	Lavaur	Saint Alan	former cathedral (bishopric suppressed in 1801)	
Le Havre Cathedral; Cathédrale Notre-Dame du Havre	Le Havre	Le Havre	Blessed Virgin Mary	cathedral	
Le Mans Cathedral; Cathédrale St-Julien du Mans	Le Mans	Le Mans	Saint Julian	cathedral	
Le Puy Cathedral; Cathédrale Notre-Dame du Puy	Le Puy	Le Puy-en-Velay	Blessed Virgin Mary	cathedral, minor basilica; World Heritage Site	
Lectoure Cathedral; Cathédrale Saint-Gervais-et-Saint-Protais de Lectoure	Auch	Lectoure	Saints Gervasius and Protasius	former cathedral (bishopric suppressed 1801)	
Lescar Cathedral; Cathédrale Notre-Dame-de-l'Assomption de Lescar	Auch	Lescar	Assumption of the Blessed Virgin Mary	former cathedral (bishopric suppressed in 1801)	
Lille Cathedral; Cathédrale Notre-Dame-de-la-Treille de Lille	Lille	Lille	Blessed Virgin Mary; Notre-Dame-de-la-Treille	cathedral, minor basilica	
Limoges Cathedral; Cathédrale Saint-Étienne de Limoges	Limoges	Limoges	Saint Stephen	cathedral	
Lisieux Cathedral; Cathédrale Saint-Pierre de Lisieux	Bayeux	Lisieux	Saint Peter	former cathedral (bishopric suppressed in 1801)	
Lodève Cathedral; Cathédrale Saint-Fulcran de Lodève, previously Cathédrale Saint-Geniez de Lodève	Montpellier	Lodève	Saint Fulcran, previously Saint Genesius of Arles	former cathedral (bishopric suppressed in 1801)	
Lombez Cathedral; Cathédrale Sainte-Marie de Lombez	Auch	Lombez	Saint Mary	former cathedral (bishopric suppressed in 1801)	
Lucciana Cathedral; Cathédrale Sainte-Marie-de-l'Assomption de Lucciana, also known as La Canonica	Ajaccio	Lucciana	Assumption of the Blessed Virgin Mary	former cathedral (bishopric suppressed in 1801)	
Luçon Cathedral; Cathédrale Notre-Dame-de-l'Assomption de Luçon	Luçon	Luçon	Assumption of the Blessed Virgin Mary	cathedral	
Lyon Cathedral; Cathédrale Primatiale Saint-Jean-Baptiste de Lyon	Lyon	Lyon	Saint John the Baptist	cathedral; World Heritage Site	
Mâcon Cathedral; Cathédrale Saint-Vincent de Mâcon	Autun	Mâcon	Saint Vincent	former cathedral (bishopric suppressed in 1801)	
Maguelone Cathedral; Cathédrale Saint-Pierre [or Saint-Pierre-et-Saint-Paul] de Maguelone	Montpellier	Villeneuve-lès-Maguelone	Saint Peter; Saint Paul	former cathedral (bishopric transferred to Montpellier in 1536)	
Maillezais Cathedral; Cathédrale Saint-Pierre de Maillezais	La Rochelle	Maillezais	Saint Peter	former abbey church and cathedral, ruins (destroyed in 1562; bishopric re-established in La Rochelle in 1648)	
Marseille Cathedral; Cathédrale Sainte-Marie-Majeure de Marseille	Marseille	Marseille	Saint Mary Major	cathedral (from 1893), minor basilica	
(Vieille Major); Ancienne Cathédrale Sainte-Marie-Majeure de Marseille	Marseille	Marseille	Saint Mary Major	former cathedral, part demolished (cathedral until 1893)	
Meaux Cathedral; Cathédrale Saint-Étienne de Meaux	Meaux	Meaux	Saint Stephen	cathedral, minor basilica	
Mende Cathedral; Cathédrale Notre-Dame-et-Saint-Privat de Mende	Mende	Mende	Blessed Virgin Mary; Saint Privatus	cathedral, minor basilica	
Metz Cathedral; Cathédrale Saint-Étienne de Metz	Metz	Metz	Saint Stephen	cathedral	
Mirepoix Cathedral; Cathédrale Saint-Maurice de Mirepoix	Pamiers	Mirepoix	Saint Maurice	former cathedral (bishopric suppressed in 1801)	
Montauban Cathedral; Cathédrale Notre-Dame-de-l'Assomption de Montauban	Montauban	Montauban	Assumption of the Blessed Virgin Mary	cathedral	
Montpellier Cathedral; Cathédrale Saint-Pierre-et-Saint-Paul de Montpellier	Montpellier	Montpellier	Saint Peter and Saint Paul	cathedral, minor basilica	
Moulins Cathedral; Cathédrale Notre-Dame de Moulins	Moulins	Moulins	Blessed Virgin Mary	cathedral, minor basilica	
Moûtiers Cathedral; Concathédrale Saint-Pierre de Moûtiers	Chambéry-Saint-Jean-de Maurienne-Tarentaise	Moûtiers en Tarentaise	Saint Peter	co-cathedral (archbishopric suppressed in 1801; bishopric re-established in 1825, suppressed in 1966)	
Nancy Cathedral; Cathédrale Notre-Dame-de-l'Annonciation de Nancy, sometimes Cathédrale Notre-Dame-de-l'Annonciation-et-Saint-Sigisbert de Nancy	Nancy	Nancy	Annunciation of the Blessed Virgin Mary; Saint Sigebert	cathedral	
Nanterre Cathedral; Cathédrale Sainte-Geneviève-et-Saint-Maurice de Nanterre	Nanterre	Nanterre	Saint Genevieve; Saint Maurice	cathedral	
Nantes Cathedral; Cathédrale Saint-Pierre de Nantes	Nantes	Nantes	Saint Peter	cathedral	
Narbonne Cathedral; Cathédrale Saint-Just et Saint-Pasteur	Carcassonne et Narbonne	Narbonne	Saints Justus and Pastor	former cathedral (archbishopric suppressed in 1801); minor basilica	
Nevers Cathedral; Cathédrale Saint-Cyr-et-Sainte-Julitte de Nevers	Nevers	Nevers	Saints Cyriacus and Julitta	cathedral, minor basilica	
Nice Cathedral; Cathédrale Sainte-Réparate de Nice	Nice	Nice	Saint Reparata	cathedral, minor basilica (elevated to a cathedral in 1590 - see Cimiez Cathedral)	
Nîmes Cathedral; Cathédrale Notre-Dame-et-Saint-Castor de Nîmes	Nîmes	Nîmes	Blessed Virgin Mary; Saint Castor	cathedral, minor basilica	
Noyon Cathedral; Cathédrale Notre-Dame de Noyon	Beauvais	Noyon	Blessed Virgin Mary	former cathedral (bishopric suppressed in 1801)	
Oloron Cathedral; Cathédrale Sainte-Marie d'Oloron-Sainte-Marie	Bayonne	Oloron-Sainte-Marie	Saint Mary	former cathedral (bishopric suppressed in 1801)	
Orange Cathedral; Cathédrale Notre-Dame-de-Nazareth d'Orange	Avignon	Orange	Our Lady of Nazareth	former cathedral (bishopric suppressed in 1801)	
Orléans Cathedral	Orléans	Orléans	Holy Cross	cathedral, minor basilica	
Pamiers Cathedral; Cathédrale Saint-Antonin de Pamiers	Pamiers	Pamiers	Saint Antoninus	cathedral	
Notre-Dame de Paris; Cathédrale Notre-Dame de Paris	Paris	Paris	Blessed Virgin Mary	cathedral, minor basilica; National Heritage site; damaged by fire in 2019; re-opened in 2024	
Cathedral of Saint-Louis-des-Invalides, Paris, otherwise the Invalides Chapel or St. Louis' Church, Les Invalides; Cathédrale Saint-Louis-des-Invalides de Paris	Military Ordinariate, France; Diocèse aux Armées Françaises	Paris, Les Invalides	Saint Louis	cathedral, hospital chapel	
Périgueux Cathedral; Cathédrale Saint-Front de Périgueux	Périgueux	Périgueux	Saint Frontinus	cathedral (from 1669), minor basilica; World Heritage Site	
Périgueux Cathedral; Cathédrale Saint-Étienne-de-la-Cité de Périgueux	Périgueux	Périgueux	Saint Stephen	former cathedral (up to 1669)	
Perpignan Cathedral; Cathédrale Saint-Jean-Baptiste de Perpignan	Perpignan-Elne	Perpignan	Saint John the Baptist	cathedral, minor basilica	
Poitiers Cathedral; Cathédrale Saint-Pierre de Poitiers	Poitiers	Poitiers	Saint Peter	cathedral, minor basilica	
Pontigny Abbey; Cathédrale-abbatiale de Notre-Dame-de-l’Assomption, Pontigny	Territorial prelature of the Mission de France	Pontigny	Assumption of the Blessed Virgin Mary	cathedral, former abbey church	
Pontoise Cathedral; Cathédrale Saint-Maclou de Pontoise	Pontoise	Pontoise	Saint Maclovius	cathedral	
Quimper Cathedral; Cathédrale Saint-Corentin de Quimper	Quimper	Quimper	Saint Corentinus	cathedral, minor basilica	
Reims Cathedral; Cathédrale Notre-Dame de Reims	Reims	Reims	Blessed Virgin Mary	cathedral, minor basilica; UNESCO World Heritage Site	
Rennes Cathedral; Cathédrale Saint-Pierre de Rennes	Rennes	Rennes	Saint Peter	cathedral	
Rennes Pro-Cathedral; Pro-cathédrale Notre-Dame-en-Saint-Mélaine de Rennes	Rennes	Rennes	Blessed Virgin Mary	former pro-cathedral	
Rieux Cathedral; Cathédrale de la Nativité-de-Marie de Rieux	Toulouse	Rieux-Volvestre	Nativity of the Blessed Virgin Mary	former cathedral (bishopric suppressed in 1801)	
Riez Cathedral; Cathédrale Notre-Dame-de-l'Assomption de Riez	Digne	Riez	Assumption of the Blessed Virgin Mary	former cathedral (bishopric suppressed in 1801)	
Rodez Cathedral; Cathédrale Notre-Dame de Rodez	Rodez	Rodez	Blessed Virgin Mary	cathedral, minor basilica	
Rouen Cathedral; Cathédrale Notre-Dame de Rouen	Rouen	Rouen	Blessed Virgin Mary	cathedral	
Saint-Bertrand-de-Comminges Cathedral; Cathédrale Notre-Dame de Saint-Bertrand-de-Comminges	Toulouse	Saint-Bertrand-de-Comminges	Blessed Virgin Mary	former cathedral (bishopric suppressed in 1801); World Heritage Site	
Saint-Brieuc Cathedral; Cathédrale Saint-Étienne de Saint-Brieuc	Saint-Brieuc	Saint-Brieuc	Saint Stephen	cathedral, minor basilica	
Saint-Claude Cathedral; Cathédrale Saint-Claude de Saint-Claude	Saint-Claude	Saint-Claude	Saint Claudius	cathedral, minor basilica	
Saint-Denis Cathedral, also known as St. Denis' Basilica and sometimes still as St. Denis's Abbey; Cathédrale Saint-Denis, Basilique Saint-Denis, Abbaye Saint-Denis	Saint-Denis	Saint-Denis, Seine-Saint-Denis	Saint Denis	cathedral, immemorial minor basilica, former abbey church	
Saint-Dié Cathedral; Cathédrale Saint-Dié de Saint-Dié	Saint-Dié	Saint-Dié-des-Vosges	Saint Deodatus	cathedral	
Saint-Étienne Cathedral; Cathédrale Saint-Charles-de-Borromé de Saint-Étienne	Saint-Étienne	Saint-Étienne	Saint Charles Borromeo	cathedral	
Saint-Florent Cathedral; Cathédrale Saint-Florent de Saint-Florent	Ajaccio	Saint-Florent, formerly Nebbio	Saint Florentius	former cathedral (bishopric suppressed in 1801)	
Saint-Flour Cathedral; Cathédrale Saint-Pierre-et-Saint-Flour de Saint-Flour	Saint-Flour	Saint-Flour	Saint Peter; Saint Florus	cathedral	
Saint-Jean-de-Maurienne Cathedral; Concathédrale Saint-Jean-Baptiste de Saint-Jean-de-Maurienne	Chambéry-Saint-Jean-de Maurienne-Tarentaise	Saint-Jean-de-Maurienne	Saint John the Baptist	co-cathedral	
Saint-Lizier Cathedral; Cathédrale Notre-Dame-de-la-Sède de Saint-Lizier and Cathédrale Saint-Lizier de Saint-Lizier	Pamiers	Saint-Lizier	Blessed Virgin Mary (Notre-Dame-de-la-Sède); Saint Lycerius	former cathedral (bishopric suppressed in 1801); World Heritage Site	
Saint-Malo Cathedral; Cathédrale Saint-Vincent-de-Saragosse de Saint-Malo	Rennes	Saint-Malo	Saint Vincent of Saragossa	former cathedral (bishopric suppressed in 1801)	
Saint-Omer Cathedral; Cathédrale Notre-Dame de Saint-Omer	Arras	Saint-Omer	Blessed Virgin Mary	former cathedral (bishopric suppressed in 1801)	
Saint-Papoul Cathedral; Cathédrale Saint-Papoul de Saint-Papoul	Carcassonne et Narbonne	Saint-Papoul	Saint Papulus	former cathedral (bishopric suppressed in 1801), abbey church, parish church	
Saint-Paul-Trois-Châteaux Cathedral; Cathédrale Notre-Dame de Saint-Paul-Trois-Châteaux	Valence	Saint-Paul-Trois-Châteaux	Blessed Virgin Mary	former cathedral (bishopric suppressed in 1801)	
Saint-Pol-de-Léon Cathedral; Cathédrale Saint-Paul-Aurélien de Saint-Pol-de-Léon	Quimper	Saint-Pol-de-Léon	Saint Paul Aurelian	former cathedral (bishopric suppressed in 1801); minor basilica	
Saint-Pons-de-Thomières Cathedral; Cathédrale Saint-Pons de Saint-Pons-de-Thomières	Montpellier	Saint-Pons-de-Thomières	Saint Pontius	former cathedral (bishopric suppressed in 1801)	
Saintes Cathedral; Cathédrale Saint-Pierre de Saintes	La Rochelle	Saintes	Saint Peter	former cathedral (bishopric suppressed in 1801)	
Sarlat Cathedral; Cathédrale Saint-Sacerdos de Sarlat	Périgueux	Sarlat-la-Canéda	Saint Sacerdos	former cathedral (bishopric suppressed in 1801)	
Sées Cathedral; Cathédrale Notre-Dame de Sées	Sées	Sées	Blessed Virgin Mary	cathedral, minor basilica	
Senez Cathedral; Cathédrale Notre-Dame-de-l'Assomption de Senez	Digne	Senez	Assumption of the Blessed Virgin Mary	former cathedral (bishopric suppressed in 1801)	
Senlis Cathedral; Cathédrale Notre-Dame de Senlis	Beauvais	Senlis	Blessed Virgin Mary	former cathedral (bishopric suppressed in 1801)	
Sens Cathedral; Cathédrale Saint-Étienne de Sens	Sens	Sens	Saint Stephen	cathedral	
Sisteron Cathedral; Cathédrale or Concathédrale Notre-Dame-et-Saint-Thyrse de Sisteron; now Église Notre-Dame-des-Pommiers	Digne	Sisteron	Blessed Virgin Mary and Saint Thyrsus; now Blessed Virgin Mary (Notre-Dame-des-Pommiers, or "Our Lady of the Apple-trees")	former cathedral or co-cathedral (bishopric suppressed in 1801)	
Soissons Cathedral; Cathédrale Saint-Gervais-et-Saint-Protais de Soissons	Soissons	Soissons	Saints Gervasius and Protasius	cathedral, minor basilica	
Sospel Cathedral; Concathédrale Saint-Michel de Sospel	Nice	Sospel	Saint Michael	former cathedral (bishopric suppressed not later than 1801)	
Strasbourg Cathedral; Cathédrale Notre-Dame de Strasbourg	Strasbourg	Strasbourg	Blessed Virgin Mary	cathedral	
Tarbes Cathedral; Cathédrale Notre-Dame-de-la-Sède de Tarbes	Tarbes et Lourdes	Tarbes	Blessed Virgin Mary; Notre-Dame-de-la-Sède	cathedral	
Thérouanne Cathedral; Cathédrale Notre-Dame de Thérouanne	Boulogne	Thérouanne	Blessed Virgin Mary	former cathedral, no remains on site, apart from archaeological excavations (bishopric suppressed in 1537; re-established at Boulogne in 1567)	
Toul Cathedral; Cathédrale Saint-Étienne de Toul	Nancy	Toul	Saint Stephen	former cathedral (bishopric suppressed 1801)	
Toulon Cathedral; Cathédrale Notre-Dame-de-la-Sède de Toulon or Sainte-Marie-Majeure	Fréjus-Toulon	Toulon	Blessed Virgin Mary (Notre-Dame-de-la-Sède) or Saint Mary Major	cathedral	
Toulouse Cathedral; Cathédrale Saint-Étienne de Toulouse	Toulouse	Toulouse	Saint Stephen	cathedral	
Tours Cathedral; Cathédrale Saint-Gatien de Tours	Tours	Tours	Saint Gatianus	cathedral	
Tréguier Cathedral, now Basilica of St. Tugdual, Tréguier; Basilique Saint-Tugdual de Tréguier	Saint-Brieuc	Tréguier	Saint Tudwal	former cathedral (bishopric suppressed in 1801), minor basilica, parish church	
Troyes Cathedral; Cathédrale Saint-Pierre-et-Saint-Paul de Troyes	Troyes	Troyes	Saint Peter and Saint Paul	cathedral	
Tulle Cathedral; Cathédrale Notre-Dame de Tulle	Tulle	Tulle	Blessed Virgin Mary	cathedral	
Uzès Cathedral; Cathédrale Saint-Théodorit d'Uzès	Nîmes	Uzès	Saint Theodoritus	former cathedral (bishopric suppressed in 1801)	
Vabres Cathedral; Cathédrale Saint-Sauveur-et-Saint-Pierre de Vabres	Rodez	Vabres-l'Abbaye	Holy Saviour and Saint Peter	former cathedral (bishopric suppressed in 1801)	
Vaison Cathedral; Cathédrale Notre-Dame-de-Nazareth de Vaison	Avignon	Vaison-la-Romaine	Our Lady of Nazareth	former cathedral (bishopric suppressed in 1801)	
Vaison Cathedral; Cathédrale Sainte-Marie-de-l'Assomption de Vaison	Avignon	Vaison-la-Romaine	Assumption of the Blessed Virgin Mary	former cathedral (bishopric suppressed in 1801)	
Valence Cathedral; Cathédrale Saint-Apollinaire de Valence	Valence	Valence	Saint Apollinaris of Valence	cathedral, minor basilica	
Vannes Cathedral; Cathédrale Saint-Pierre-et-Saint-Patern de Vannes	Vannes	Vannes	Saint Peter and Saint Paternus	cathedral, minor basilica	
Vence Cathedral; Cathédrale de la Nativité-de-Marie de Vence	Nice	Vence	Nativity of the Blessed Virgin Mary	former cathedral (bishopric suppressed in 1801)	
Verdun Cathedral; Cathédrale Notre-Dame de Verdun	Verdun	Verdun	Blessed Virgin Mary	cathedral, minor basilica	
Versailles Cathedral; Cathédrale Saint-Louis de Versailles	Versailles	Versailles	Saint Louis	cathedral	
Vescovato Cathedral; Pro-cathédrale Saint-Martin de Vescovato	Ajaccio	Vescovato	Saint Martin	former cathedral (bishopric suppressed in 1801)	
Vico Cathedral; Cathédrale Saint-Appien de Vico	Ajaccio	Vico	Saint Appian	former cathedral (bishopric suppressed in 1801)	
Vienne Cathedral; Cathédrale Saint-Maurice de Vienne	Grenoble-Vienne	Vienne	Saint Maurice	former cathedral (bishopric suppressed in 1801)	
Viviers Cathedral; Cathédrale Saint-Vincent de Viviers	Viviers	Viviers	Saint Vincent	cathedral	

== Non-Roman Catholic cathedrals ==
Cathedral	Archdiocese or Diocese	Location	Dedication	Church	Image
Russian Orthodox Cathedral, Nice; Cathédrale Orthodoxe Russe Saint-Nicolas de Nice	Archdiocese of Russian Orthodox Churches in Western Europe (under the Ecumenical Patriarchate of Constantinople)	Nice	Saint Nicholas	Russian Orthodox Church	
American Cathedral in Paris, or Cathedral of the Holy Trinity; Cathédrale de la Sainte-Trinité de Paris	Convocation of Episcopal Churches in Europe	Paris, Avenue Georges V	Holy Trinity	The Episcopal Church	
Armenian Apostolic Cathedral, Paris; Cathédrale Apostolique Arménienne St. Jean-Baptiste de Paris	Diocese of Armenian Apostolic Churches of France (Diocèse des Eglises Apostoliques Arméniennes de France)	Paris, Rue Jean-Goujon	Saint John the Baptist	Armenian Apostolic Church	
Armenian Catholic Cathedral; Cathédrale Sainte-Croix-de-Paris	Armenian Catholic Eparchy of Sainte-Croix-de-Paris	Paris, Rue du Perche	Holy Cross	Armenian Catholic Church	
Greek Orthodox Cathedral, Paris; Cathédrale Saint-Étienne de Paris	Metropolis of France (under the Ecumenical Patriarchate of Constantinople)	Paris, Rue Georges Bizet	Saint Stephen	Greek Orthodox Church	
Maronite Cathedral, Paris; Cathédrale Notre-Dame-du-Liban de Paris	Maronite Catholic Eparchy of Our Lady of Lebanon of Paris	Paris, Rue d'Ulm	Our Lady of Lebanon	Maronite Church	
Russian Orthodox Cathedral, Paris; Cathédrale Saint-Alexandre-Nevski de Paris	Archdiocese of Russian Orthodox Churches in Western Europe (under the Ecumenical Patriarchate of Constantinople)	Paris, Rue Daru	Saint Alexander Nevsky	Russian Orthodox Church	
Ukrainian Catholic Cathedral, Paris; Cathédrale St. Volodymyr-le-Grand de Paris	Apostolic Exarchate in France, Benelux and Switzerland for the Ukrainians	Paris, Boulevard Saint-Germain	Saint Vladimir the Great	Ukrainian Catholic Church	

== Cathedrals in overseas departments, territories and collectivities ==
Cathedral	Archdiocese or Diocese	Location	Dedication	Notes	Image
Basse-Terre Cathedral; Cathédrale Notre-Dame-de-Guadeloupe de Basse-Terre	Basse-Terre	Guadeloupe, Basse-Terre	Our Lady of Guadeloupe	cathedral, minor basilica	
Cayenne Cathedral; Cathédrale Saint-Sauveur de Cayenne	Cayenne	French Guiana, Cayenne	Holy Saviour	cathedral	
Fort-de-France Cathedral; Cathédrale Saint-Louis de Fort-de-France	Fort-de-France	Martinique, Fort-de-France	Saint Louis	cathedral	
Matâ'Utu Cathedral; Cathédrale Notre-Dame-de-l'Assomption de Matâ'Utu	Wallis and Futuna	Wallis and Futuna, Matâ'Utu	Assumption of the Blessed Virgin Mary	cathedral	
Nouméa Cathedral; Cathédrale Saint-Joseph de Nouméa	Nouméa	New Caledonia, Nouméa	Saint Joseph	cathedral	
Papeete Cathedral; Cathédrale Notre-Dame de Papeete	Papeete	French Polynesia, Tahiti, Papeete	Blessed Virgin Mary	cathedral	
Church of Saints Peter and Paul, Pointe-à-Pitre, known as Pointe-à-Pitre Cathedral; Cathédrale or Église Saint-Pierre-et-Saint-Paul de Pointe-à-Pitre	Basse-Terre	Guadeloupe, Pointe-à-Pitre	Saint Peter and Saint Paul	parish church; never a cathedral, although commonly known as such	
Saint-Denis Cathedral, Réunion; Cathédrale Saint-Denis de Saint-Denis, Réunion	Saint-Denis-de-La Réunion	Réunion, Saint-Denis	Saint Denis	cathedral	
Saint-Pierre Cathedral; Cathédrale Saint-Pierre de Saint-Pierre (Saint-Pierre-et-Miquelon)	Iles Saint-Pierre et Miquelon	Saint Pierre and Miquelon, Saint-Pierre	Saint Peter	cathedral	
Tai o Hae Cathedral; Cathédrale Notre-Dame de Taiohae or Cathédrale Notre-Dame des Marquises	Taiohae	French Polynesia, Marquesas Islands, Tai o Hae	Blessed Virgin Mary	cathedral	

== See also ==
- List of cathedrals
- List of basilicas in France

== Sources ==
- List of Cathedrals in France by GCatholic.org
- Catholic Hierarchy
- Mapping Gothic by Columbia University
