= Diocese of Alet =

Coordinates: 42.9956°N 2.2557°E

The former French Catholic diocese of Alet (Lat.: Electensis) was created in 1317 from territory formerly in the diocese of Narbonne. The diocese continued until the French Revolution when it was suppressed by the Concordat of 1801.

Alet-les-Bains is located in south-west France, in the current department of Aude. The diocese was divided between: diocese of Carcassonne (to which the bishopric was formally attached) the diocese of Toulouse and the diocese of Perpignan.

== History ==
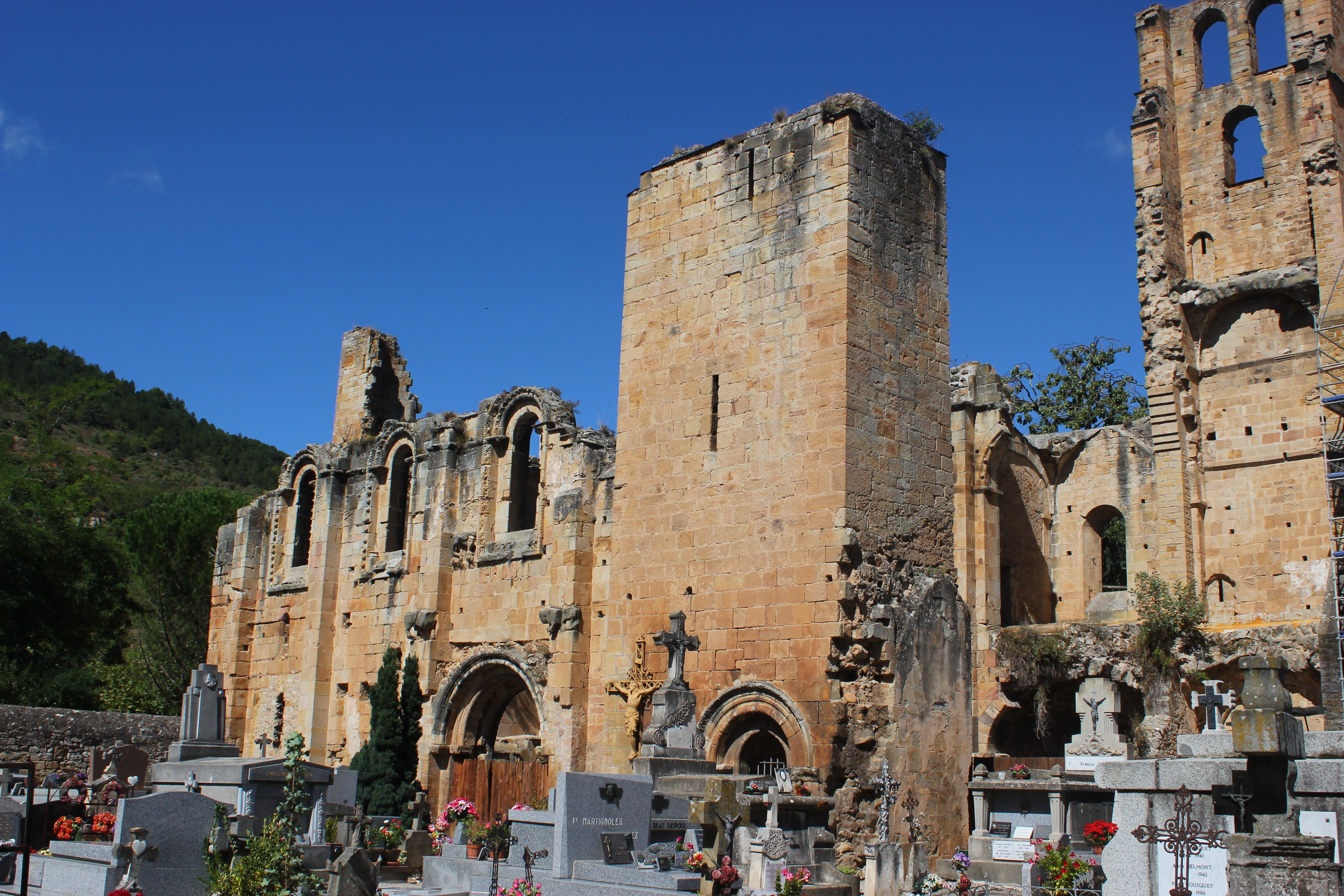
Ruins of the Abbey of Alet

In 1317, Pope John XXII engaged in a major restructuring of the episcopal organization of southern and western France. The diocese of Narbonne was very large, and it was deemed advisable to separate off the western part, the Archdeaconry of Alet, and erect it into a separate diocese. The papal bull, Sane Considerantes, issued on 20 August 1317, envisioned the creation of the new diocese with its seat at Limoux, and the promotion of the Church of Saint-Martin into a cathedral. In the next few months, however, Pope John changed his mind. On 28 (or 18) February 1318, he revoked his previous arrangements and named Alet as the site of the new bishopric; and on 1 March 1318 he appointed Bartholomaeus, the Abbot of the Monastery of Alet, and a papal nuncio, as the new bishop. His Abbey of Notre-Dame d'Alet, which followed the Rule of Saint Benedict, became the cathedral of the diocese, and its monks became Canons of the cathedral chapter. In erecting the new diocese, Pope John transferred eighty parishes from the diocese of Narbonne to Alet.

The Cathedral of Alet was served by a Chapter, composed of twelve canons. The dignities were: the Dean, the Archdeacon, the Treasurer and the Precentor. There were sixteen beneficiaries. The Chapter had the right, granted by the Papacy, to elect the bishop of Alet. The Chapter was secularized on 17 November 1531 by the papal bulla Ad Exequendum of Pope Clement VII, at the request of Bishop Guillaume de Joyeuse and at the suggestion of King Francis I. The Pope explained in the bull that the problem was twofold: the number of people seeking to become monks had greatly decreased; and the financial situation of the Chapter had severely deteriorated. At the beginning the money was sufficient to supply the needs of thirty or more monks, but in 1531 it could scarcely support seven or eight. The priories which had belonged to the Chapter had gradually been appropriated by the bishop who appointed commendatory abbots and priors, causing money to be directed away from the monastic foundations. In addition the coldness of the weather and the frequent wars, with plundering and pillaging, had diminished regular revenues. The present income could satisfy the requirements for secular dignities and canons, but could not support the entire monastic establishment. In order to place the finances of the new secular chapter on a firm footing, the Pope ordered the suppression of a number of priories in several dioceses: Notre-Dame de Peyran et de Rupefort, S. Valerius, de Varilles, de Exchalabria, and de Rupifera (all Benedictine houses); many of these were being held in commendam, but all were placed at the disposal of the Chapter.

Pope John XXII also secularized one of the monasteries in the new diocese, Saint Paul de Fenouillèdes, converting it into a Collegiate Church, administered by a Chapter composed of three dignitaries, twelve Canons and thirty semi-prebends. There were three other abbeys in the diocese: Saint Jacques de Jocou, Saint Martin de Lys and Saint Pierre.

The diocese was suppressed by the National Constituent Assembly in the Civil Constitution of the Clergy in 1790. The territory of the diocese of Alet was incorporated into a new (republican) 'Constitutional Diocese', the Diocese of Aude, which was coterminous with the new administrative Département de l'Aude (named after a river); the new diocese included 565 parishes which had been part of the (arch)dioceses of Narbonne, Carcassonne, Alet, Saint-Papoul and Mirepoix. The headquarters of the diocese was to be Narbonne, and the Metropolitan of the Metropolitanate of the 'Métropole du Sud' was to be in Toulouse.

After the signing of the Concordat of 1801 with First Consul Napoleon Bonaparte, the diocese of Alet was not revived, but abolished by Pope Pius VII in his bull Qui Christi Domini of 29 November 1801.

== Bishops ==
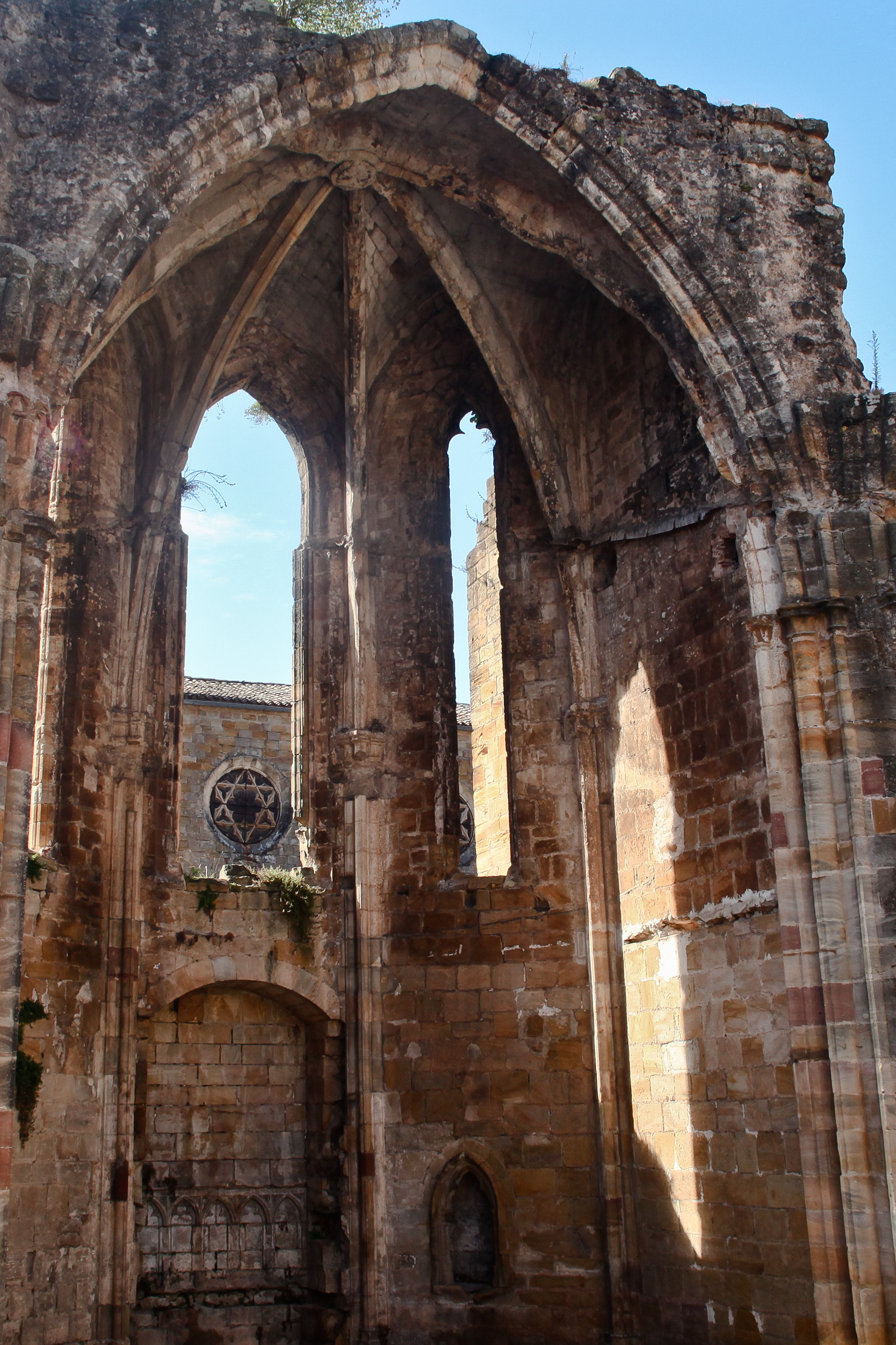
Interior of church of the Abbey of Alet

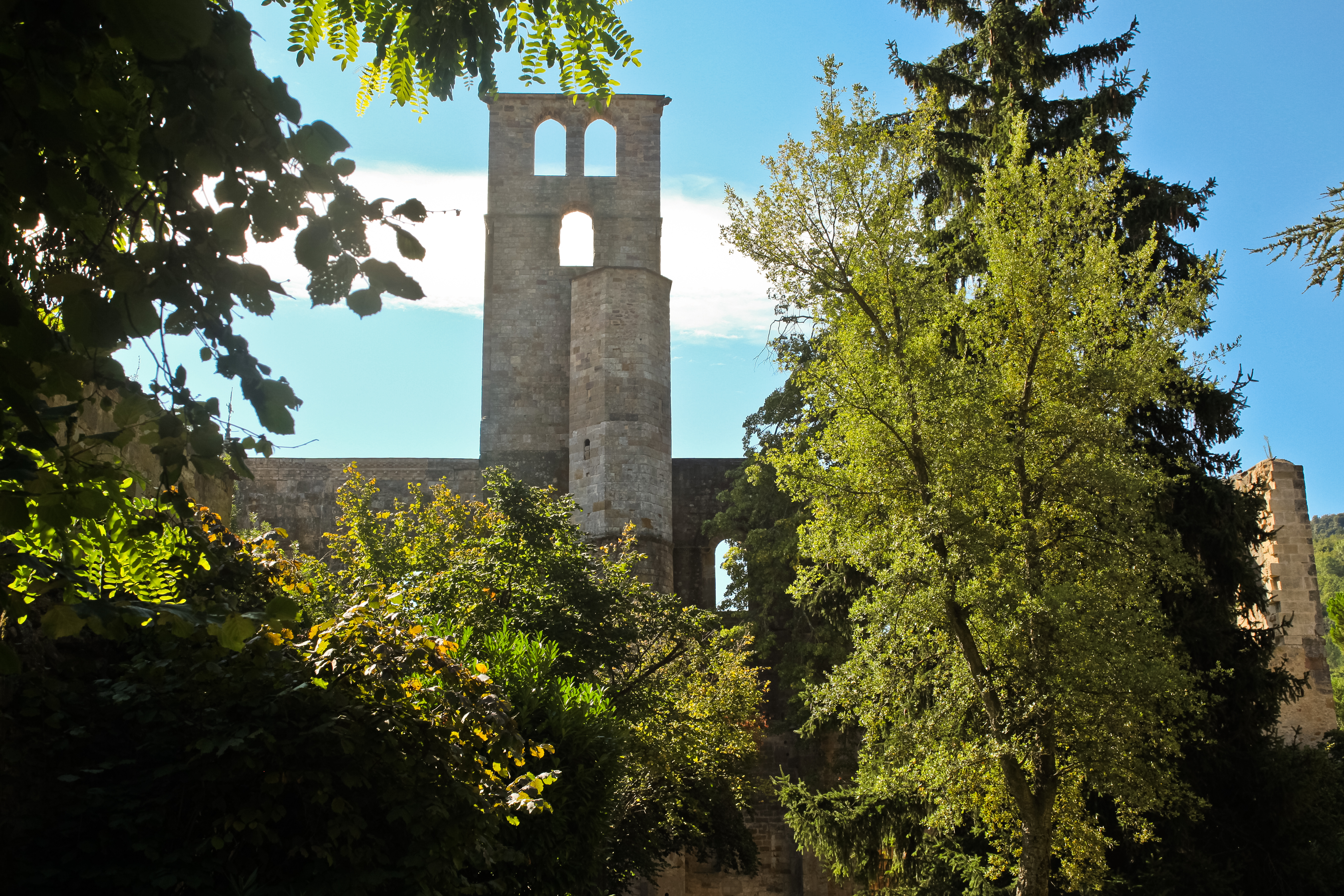
The episcopal palace, Alet

- 1318–1333 ?: Barthélemy, O.S.B., Abbot Sainte-Marie d'Alet
- 1333-†1355 : Guillaume (I) d'Alzonne, O.S.B., Abbot of la Grasse
- 1355-†1363 : Guillame (II), O.S.B., Abbot of Sendras
- 1363-†1385 : Arnaud de Villars
- 1385–1386 : Cardinal Pierre Aycelin de Montaigut (Administrator)
- 1386–1390 : Robert du Bosc (Avignon Obedience)
- 1390-†1420 : Henri (I) Bayler (Avignon Obedience)
- 1421–1441 : Pierre (II) Assalbit, O.E.S.A.
- 1441–1442 : Antoine de Saint-Étienne
- 1443–1447 : Pierre (III)
- 1448–1454 : Élie de Pompadour
- 1454–1455 : Louis d'Aubusson, O.S.B.
- 1455–1460 : Ambroise de Cameraco, Abbot of Saint-Germain-des-Prés
- 1461-†1468 : Antoine (I) Gobert
- 1468-†1486 : Guillaume (III.) Oliva
- 1487–1488 : Pierre (III) Hallwyn
- 1489-†1508 : Guillaume (IV.) de Rupe, Abbot of Montolieu

[Jean Dupuy, Abbot of Saint-Tibéry]

- 1508–1523 : Pierre (IV.) Raymond de Guiert, Abbot of Sorèze
- 1524–1540 : Guillaume (V.) de Joyeuse
- 1541–1559 : Guillaume VI. de Joyeuse
- 1560-†1564 : François de Lestrange
- 1565–1572? : Antoine (II.) Dax

(1572–1594) : Sede Vacante

- [1594–1603 : Christophe de L'Estang]
- 1603-†1603 : Pierre (V.) de Polverel
- 1607-1637 : Étienne de Polverel
- 1637-†1677 : Nicolas Pavillon
- 1679–1684 : Louis-Alphonse de Valbelle
- 1692–1698 : Victor-Augustin de Méliand
- 1699-1708 : Charles-Nicolas Taffoureau de Fontaine
- 1709-1723 : Jacques Maboul
- 1723-1762 : Joseph-François de Boucaud
- 1763-1793 : Charles de la Cropte de Chantérac

== See also ==
- Catholic Church in France
- List of Catholic dioceses in France

== Bibliography ==
=== Reference works ===
- Gams, Pius Bonifatius (1873). Series episcoporum Ecclesiae catholicae: quotquot innotuerunt a beato Petro apostolo. Ratisbon: Typis et Sumptibus Georgii Josephi Manz., pp. 486–487. (Use with caution; obsolete)
- Eubel, Conradus, ed. (1913). Hierarchia catholica, Tomus 1 (second ed.). Münster: Libreria Regensbergiana. (in Latin)
- Eubel, Conradus, ed. (1914). Hierarchia catholica, Tomus 2 (second ed.). Münster: Libreria Regensbergiana. (in Latin)
- Gulik, Guilelmus (1923). Eubel, Conradus (ed.). Hierarchia catholica, Tomus 3 (second ed.). Münster: Libreria Regensbergiana.
- Gauchat, Patritius (Patrice) (1935). Hierarchia catholica IV (1592-1667). Münster: Libraria Regensbergiana.
- Ritzler, Remigius; Sefrin, Pirminus (1952). Hierarchia catholica medii et recentis aevi V (1667-1730). Patavii: Messagero di S. Antonio.
- Ritzler, Remigius; Sefrin, Pirminus (1958). Hierarchia catholica medii et recentis aevi VI (1730-1799). Patavii: Messagero di S. Antonio.

=== Studies ===
- Benedictines of Saint-Maur, ed. (1739). Gallia Christiana, In Provincias Ecclesiasticas Distributa (in Latin). Vol. Tomus Sextus (6). Paris: Ex Typographia Regia.
- De Vic, Claude; Vaisette, J. (1872). Histoire generale de Languedoc. Vol. Tome quatrieme (4). Edouard Privat. pp. 422–424.
- Du Tems, Hugues (1774). Le clergé de France, ou tableau historique et chronologique des archevêques, évêques, abbés, abbesses et chefs des chapitres principaux du royaume, depuis la fondation des églises jusqu'à nos jours (in French). Vol. Tome premier. Paris: Delalain.
- Jean, Armand (1891). Les évêques et les archevêques de France depuis 1682 jusqu'à 1801 (in French). Paris: A. Picard.
- Lasserre, Joseph Théodore (1877). Recherches historiques sur la ville d'Alet et son ancien diocèse (in French). Carcassonne: J. Parer. p. 243.
