= French Cathedral =

French Cathedral may refer to:

- French Cathedral, Berlin
- List of cathedrals in France
