= Louis-Alphonse =

Louis-Alphonse is a French given name. Notable people with the name include:

- Louis-Alphonse Boyer (1839–1916), Quebec merchant and political figure
- Louis Alphonse de Bourbon, pretender to the French throne
- Louis Alphonse de Brébisson, French botanist
- Louis-Alphonse de Valbelle, French bishop
- Louis Alphonse Gassion, French entertainer
- Louis Alphonse Koyagialo, Congolese politician

== See also ==
- Alphonse (disambiguation)
