= Étienne Pavillon =

French lawyer and poet

Étienne Pavillon (1632 – 10 January 1705) was a French lawyer and poet.

== Biography ==
Grandson of a famous lawyer and nephew of bishop Nicolas Pavillon, Pavillon was born and died in Paris. He first studied theology before renouncing this to become "avocat général" to the parliament of Metz. Before having spent ten years in that role, he had a reverse in his fortunes and returned to Paris. Suffering from gout and pensioned off by Louis XIV, he set up a salon to which high society flocked. "She found in him conversation that was fine and witty, clever and polite, instructive without being pedantic". Thus, against La Bruyère and without having asked for it, he was elected a member of the Académie française in 1691, then of the Académie des inscriptions in 1701.

Étienne Pavillon was an author of "vers de circonstance", in stanzas and madrigals, and of letters in verse or prose in the Voiture genre, gathered together for the first time in a posthumously published volume, reissued several times between 1715 and 1750. Voltaire called him "doux mais faible Pavillon".

== Quotation ==
À une Dame, sur un mal de tête
Si c'est une vapeur de la Région basse,
Dont un jeune cerveau souvent est embrasé,

Peu de chose vous embarasse.
Ce n'est qu'une chaleur, qui passe;
Et le remède en est aisé.
Accoutumés-vous à l'usage
D'une prise de Mariage,
Le soir avant vôtre sommeil.
Reiteretur au réveil;

Et, si le jour encor vous sentés quelque chose,
Apelés du secours & redoublés la dose.
Mais tout le monde en vain voudroit vous secourir,
Si le mal vient du Cœur & vous porte à la Tête.

Il faut vous résoudre à soufrir;

Vous êtes trop fidèle, Iris, pour en guérir.
