= Glandèves Cathedral =

Roman Catholic church in France

Coordinates: 43°57′3″N 6°49′23″E

Glandèves Cathedral Cathédrale Notre-Dame-de-la-Sède de Glandèves
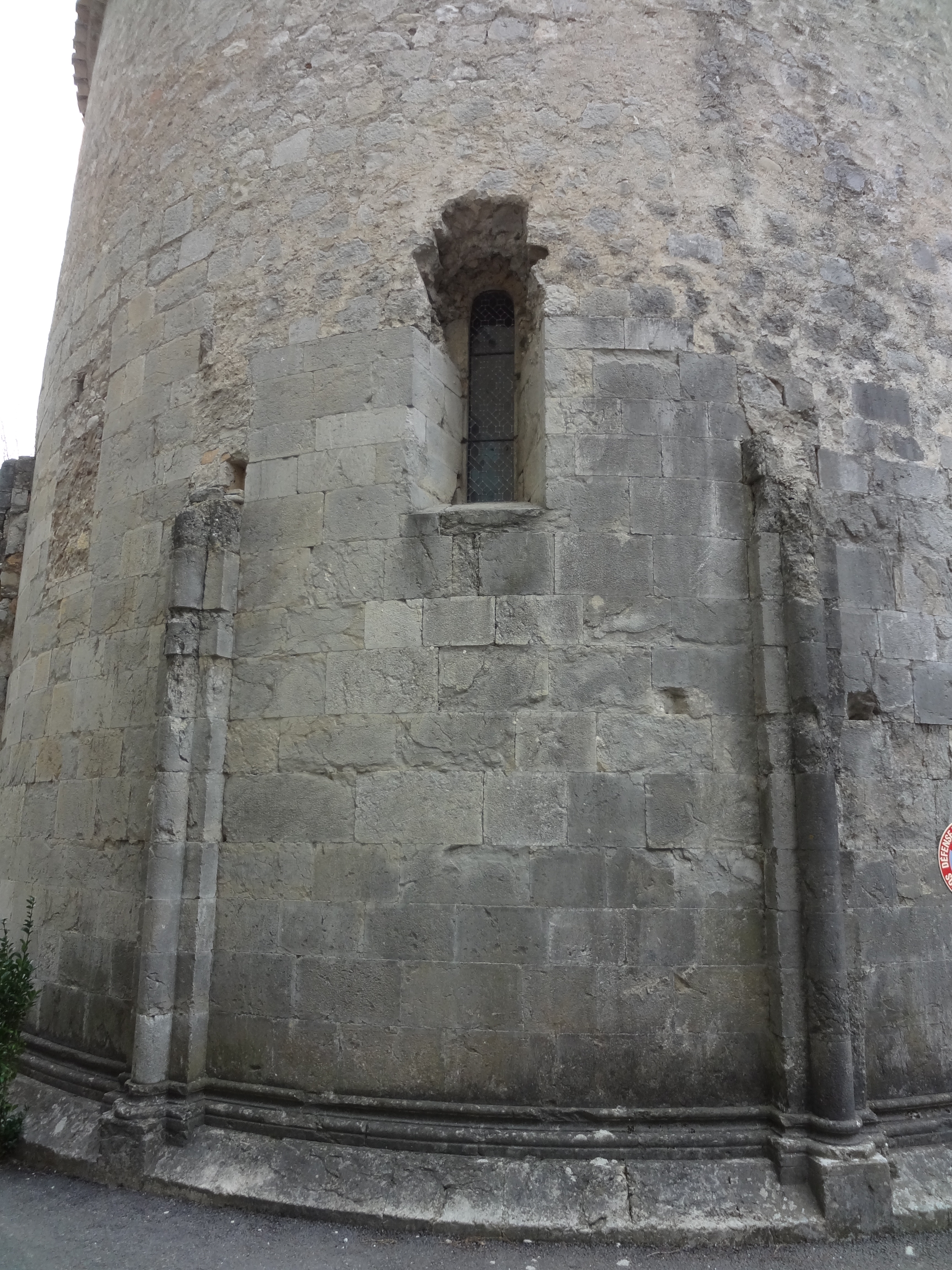
- Glandèves Cathedral

Religion
- Affiliation: Roman Catholic Church
- Province: Bishop of Glandèves
- Region: Alpes-de-Haute-Provence
- Rite: Roman
- Ecclesiastical or organisational status: Cathedral
- Status: Active

Location
- Location: Glandèves, France
- Interactive map of Glandèves Cathedral; Cathédrale Notre-Dame-de-la-Sède de Glandèves

Architecture
- Type: church
- Groundbreaking: 17th century

Glandèves Cathedral (French: Cathédrale Notre-Dame-de-la-Sède de Glandèves or Cathédrale Notre-Dame-de-la-Sède d'Entrevaux), now the Chapelle de l'Hôpital, is a Roman Catholic church located in the former town of Glandèves, Alpes-de-Haute-Provence. It was abandoned in the Middle Ages for the more secure site of the present Entrevaux. Only the chevet remains, which has been converted into a chapel. The cathedral is a national monument of France.

== History ==
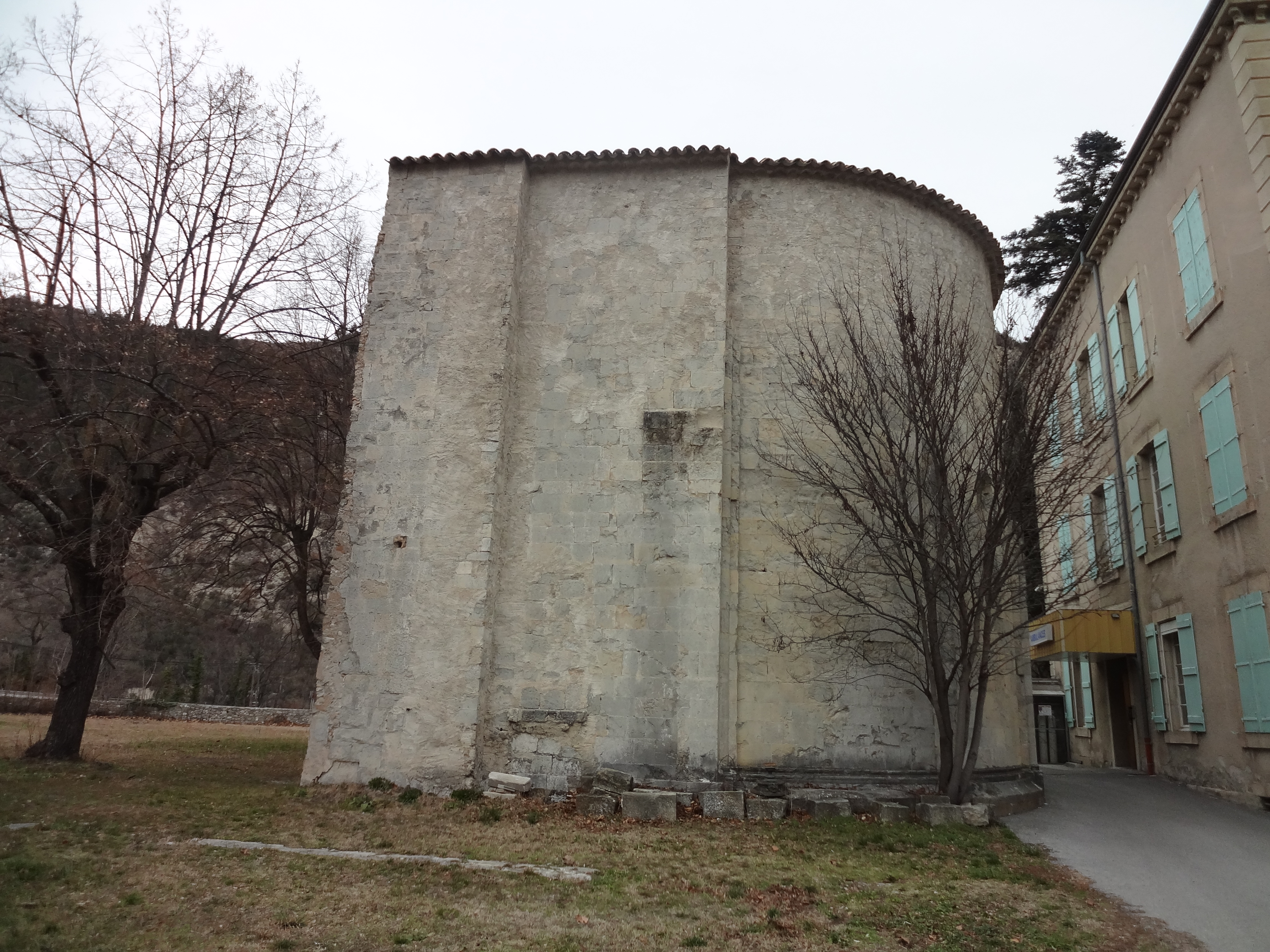
The chevet of the former cathedral, converted to a chapel

The ancient town of Glandèves occupied an exposed site that was frequently attacked and pillaged. In the 11th century the inhabitants moved to a more secure and defensible settlement at Entrevaux, although the Bishop of Glandèves remained seated at the cathedral on the old site.

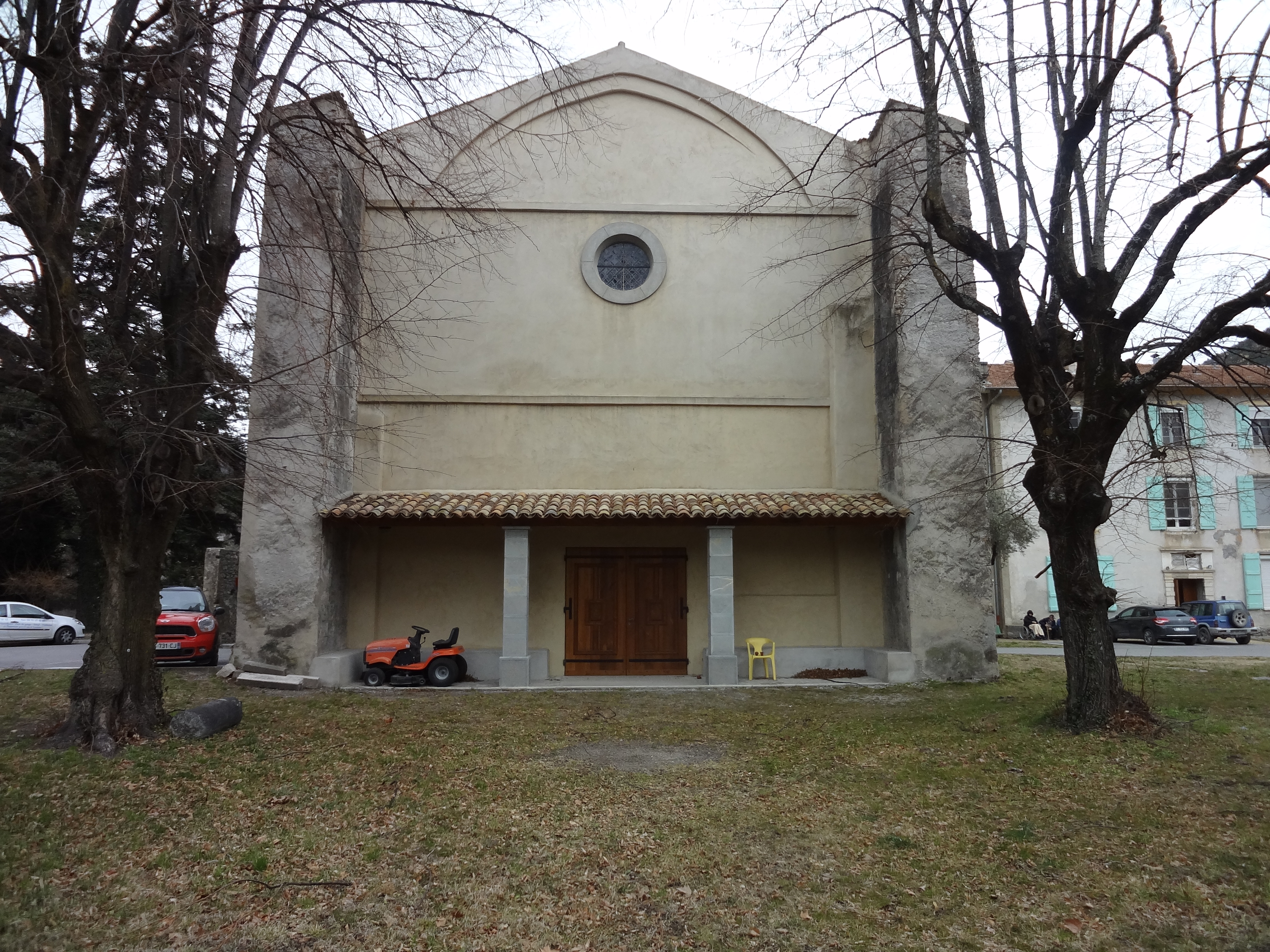
Frontage of the converted chapel

Between 1609 and 1624 a new cathedral (Entrevaux Cathedral, or the Cathédrale Notre-Dame-de-l'Assomption d'Entrevaux) was built in Entrevaux, which became the seat of the diocese at its completion.

The Diocese of Glandèves ceased to exist in the Concordat of 1801 which reformed the ecclesiastical structure of France following the French Revolution, and its territory was divided between the Diocese of Digne and the Diocese of Nice.

The old cathedral and the adjoining episcopal palace buildings were sold during the Revolution and subsequently used as a boarding house and a hospital, whence the alternative name for the present chapel as the Chapelle de l'Hôpital. The remaining structure dates from the 12th century, with some work from the later 16th century. The conversion to the chapel is modern.
