= Alet Cathedral =

Cathedral in Alet-les-Bains, France

Coordinates: 42°59′45″N 2°15′19″E

- Cathédrale Notre-Dame d'Alet
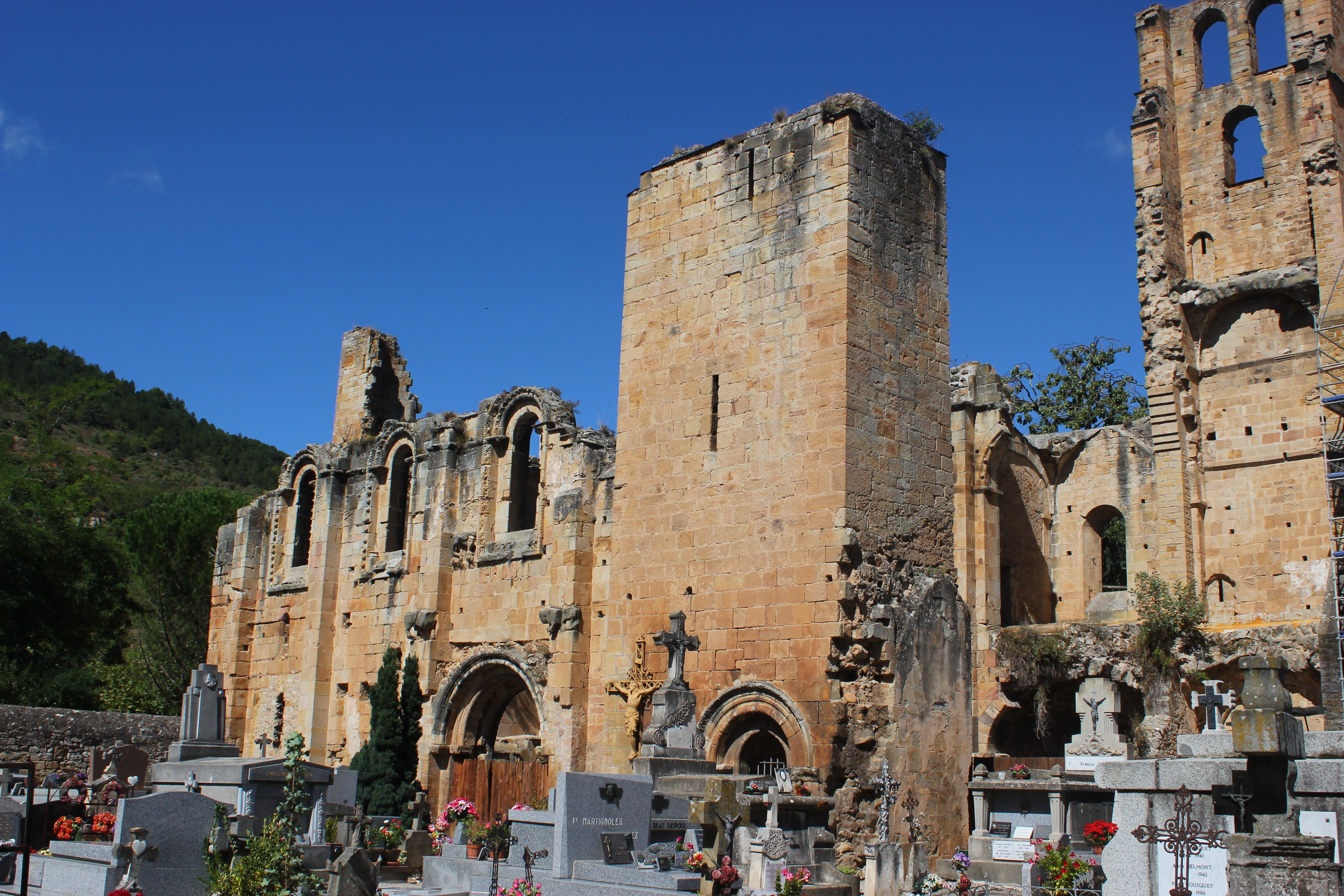
- Alet Cathedral

Religion
- Affiliation: Roman Catholic Church
- Province: Diocese of Alet
- Region: Languedoc
- Rite: Roman
- Ecclesiastical or organisational status: Cathedral
- Status: Active

Location
- Location: Alet, France
- Interactive map of Alet Cathedral

Architecture
- Type: church
- Style: Gothic
- Groundbreaking: 14th century

Alet Cathedral (Cathédrale Notre-Dame d'Alet) was a Roman Catholic church located in the town of Alet-les-Bains in Languedoc, France. The cathedral is in the Gothic architectural tradition.

== Cathedral of Our Lady ==
The Diocese of Alet was one of several bishoprics created in 1317 in the wake of the suppression of the Cathars. In Alet the bishops were also the abbots of the already existing monastery there and the cathedral of Our Lady (Notre-Dame) was built next to the abbey.

In 1577 it was largely destroyed by the Huguenots during the Wars of Religion and was not subsequently rebuilt. The immense Gothic quire was demolished by order of the last bishop, Charles de la Cropte de Chancerac in 1776. The diocese of Alet was not restored after the French Revolution and by the Concordat of 1801 its parishes were added to the Diocese of Carcassonne.

The cathedral's stone ruins, which were listed as a monument historique in 1862, remain a spectacular sight.

== St. Benedict's Cathedral ==
As the main cathedral was for so long in ruins, part of the monastic buildings were used as an emergency substitute. These premises were known as St. Benedict's Cathedral (Cathédrale Saint-Benoît d'Alet).
