= Alet-les-Bains station =

Railway station in Alet-les-Bains, France

Coordinates: 42°59′50″N 2°15′08″E

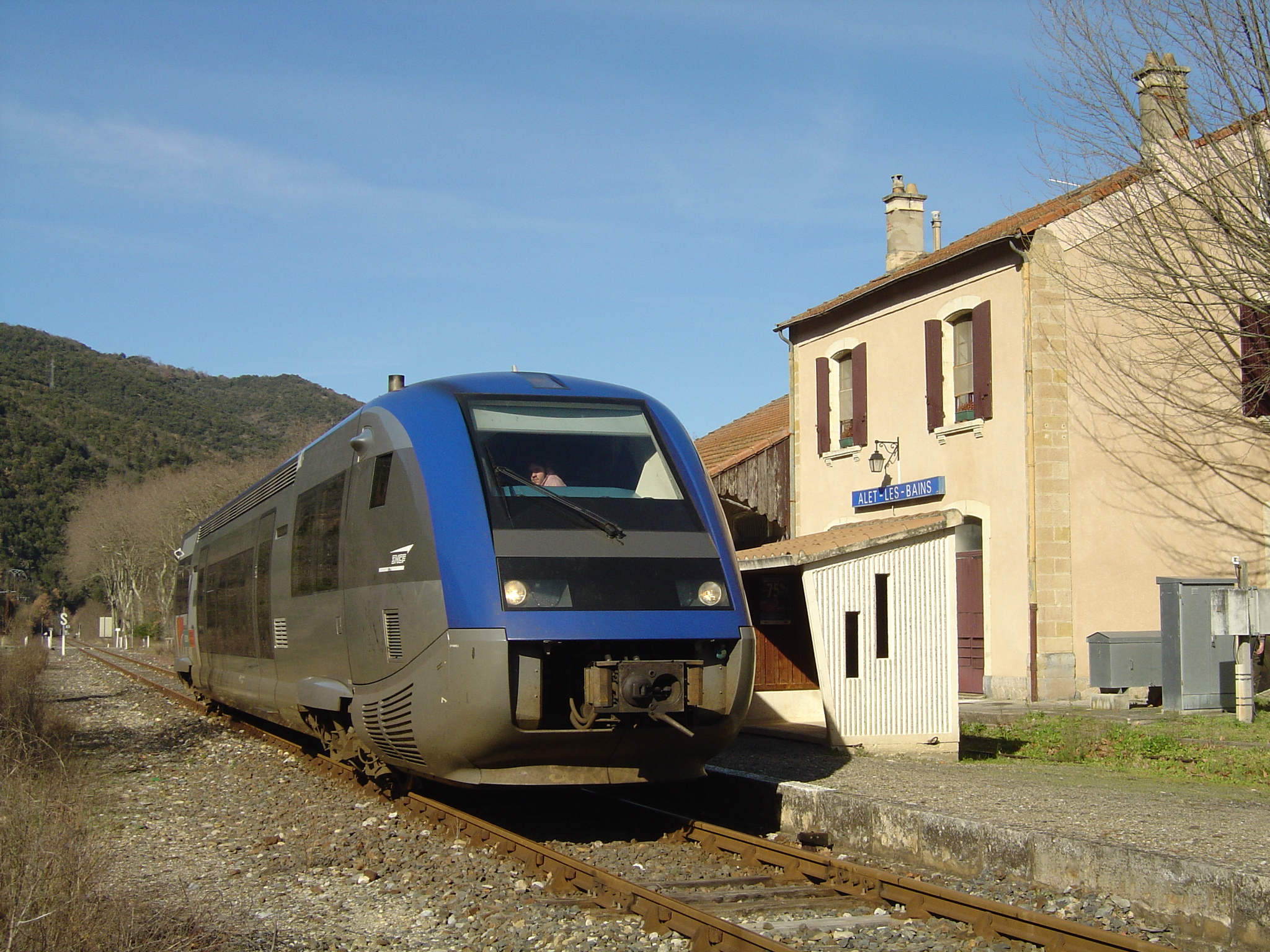
Alet-les-Bains railway station

Alet-les-Bains station (French: Gare d'Alet-les-Bains) is a French railway station in Alet-les-Bains, Occitanie, France. The station is on the Carcassonne–Rivesaltes line. The station is currently served by TER Occitanie bus services between Limoux and Quillan. Previous train services between Limoux and Quillan were suspended in 2018, and are expected to be resumed in 2025.

== See also ==
- List of SNCF stations in Occitanie
