= Secca de bœuf =

Beef food product

Secca de bœuf, or Secca d'Entrevaux, is a type of dried salted beef made in Entrevaux. Similar to the Swiss Bündnerfleisch, it is typically eaten as a starter, thinly sliced and served with virgin olive oil, lemon juice, and sliced tomatoes.

== See also ==
- List of dried foods
