= Entrevaux Cathedral =

Roman Catholic church and former cathedral in Glandèves, France

Coordinates: 43.9503°N 6.8110°E

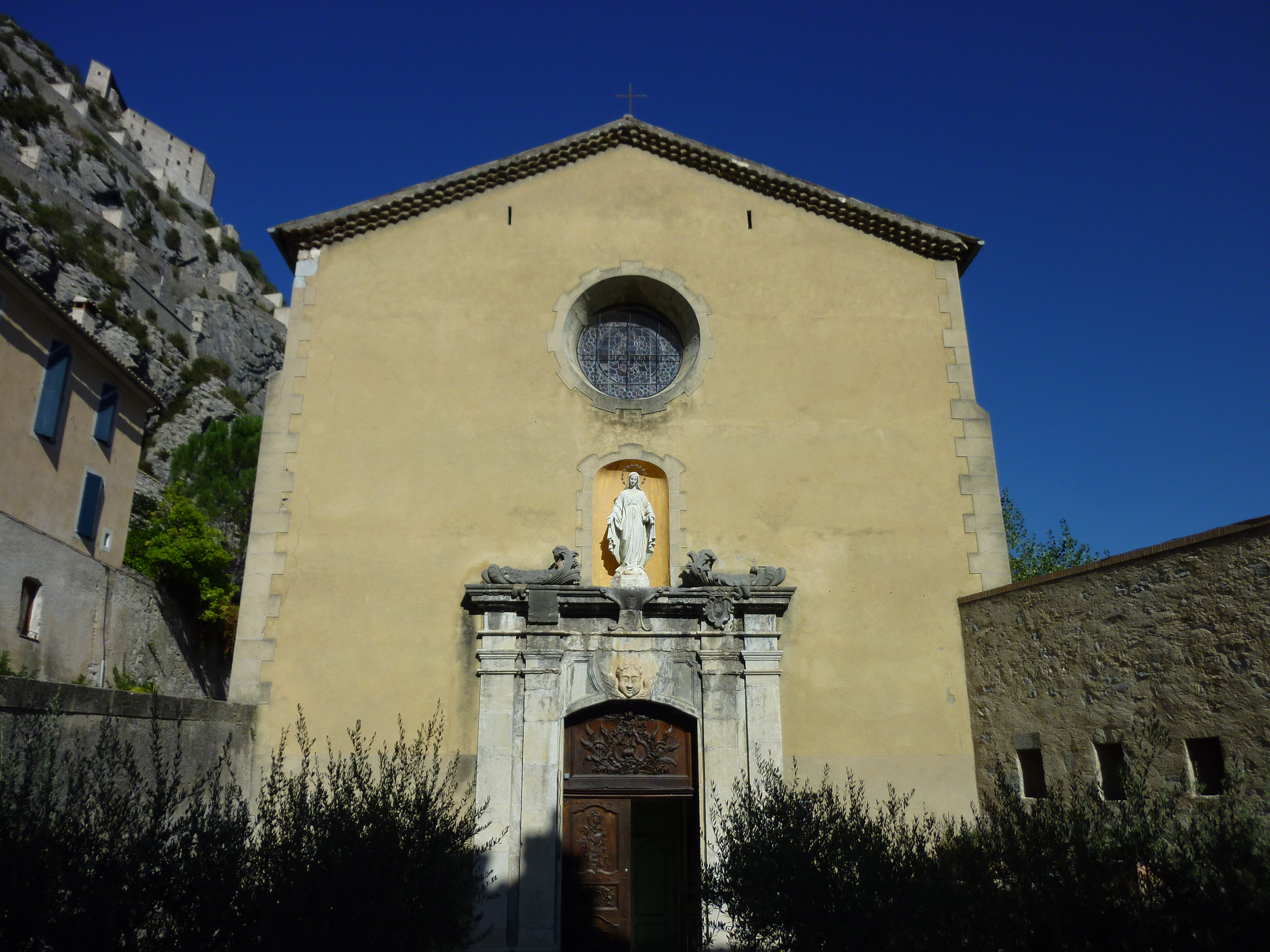
Facade of the cathedral

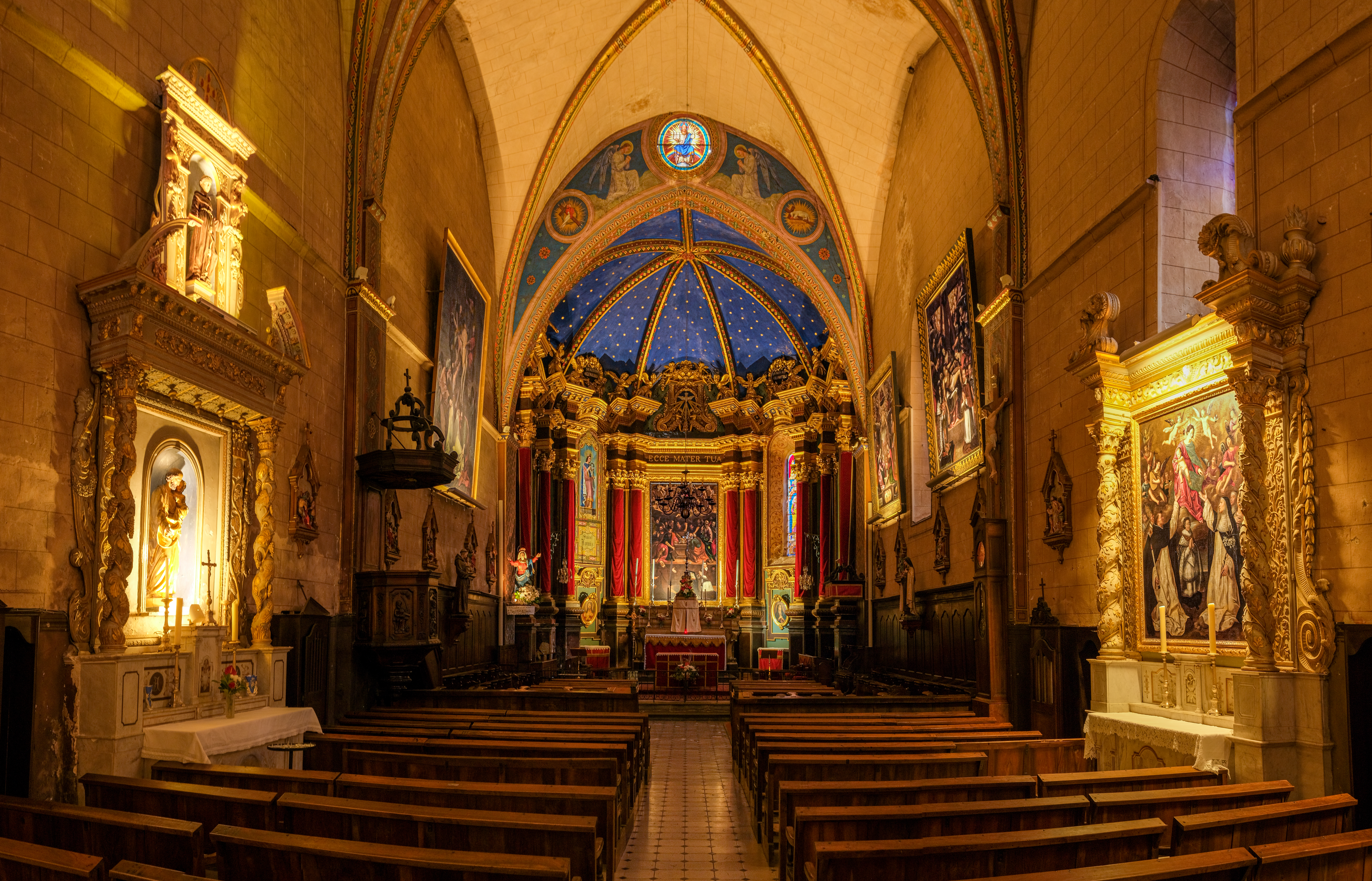
The interior of the cathedral.

Entrevaux Cathedral (French: Cathédrale Notre-Dame-de-l'Assomption d'Entrevaux) is a Roman Catholic church and former cathedral in Glandèves, France. It was the seat of the bishops of Glandèves, who moved their principal residence to Entrevaux in the early 17th century. The edifice served as a cathedral from 1624 to 1790, known at the time from the name of the diocese as the Glandèves Cathedral. It is now a parish church.

== Construction ==
The site of the ancient town of Glandèves, where the bishops' seat had been established since the end of the Roman Empire, was insecure, and the population moved in the 11th century to Entrevaux, which was easier to defend. Glandèves Cathedral and the bishop's establishment however remained on the old site until 1603.

In 1604 the bishop Octave Isnard decided to build a new cathedral at Entrevaux. Construction work lasted from 1609 to 1630; decoration was completed in the 1650s, and the bell tower in the 1660s. It was probably consecrated in 1627. It was listed as a monument historique on 27 June 1966.

== Description ==
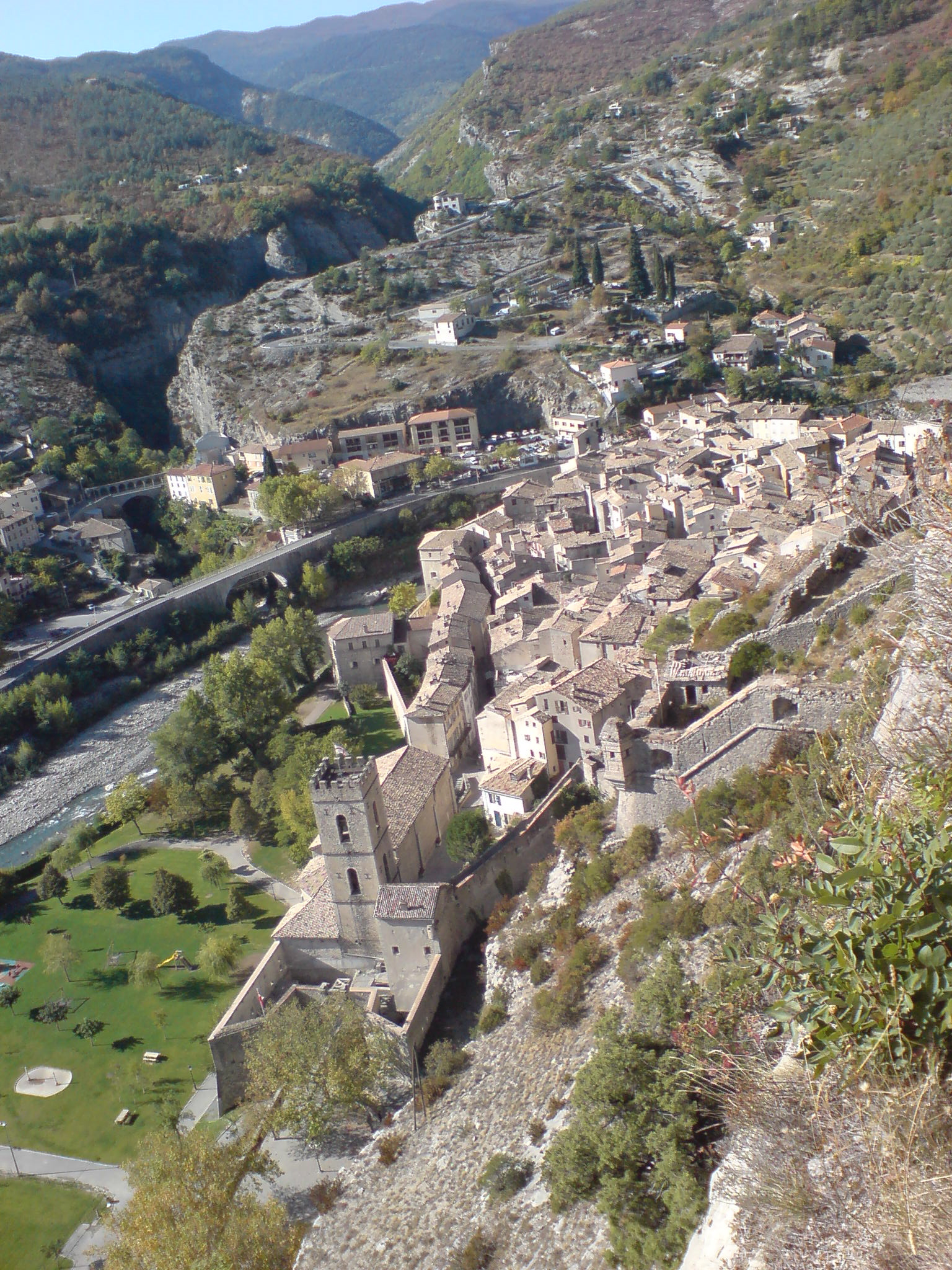
View of Entrevaux, with the cathedral in the foreground

Because of the restricted site and the necessities of defending the town, the new cathedral was oriented to the north-east. It is 40 metres long, 10 metres wide and the height to the top of the vault is 14 metres.

There is a single nave of three bays, with no side chapels. There are three windows in the south wall, while the north wall is blind.

The cathedral was integrated into the town's fortifications in 1692, when the bell tower was crenellated for use as a defensive tower.

The choir is richly decorated.

The furnishings and works of art, including an "Assumption" of c. 1630 and a "Gift of the Rosary" of 1631 forming part of the altar, both by François Mimault, and a portrait of the bishop Jean-Baptiste de Belloy, are mostly of the 17th and early 18th centuries.

The organs are dated 1717 and were restored in 1864 and 1948. Their instrumental parts were made by Jean Eustache of Marseilles. They are listed.

== Notes and references ==
=== Sources ===
- Collier, Raymond (1986). La Haute-Provence monumentale et artistique. Digne: Imprimerie Louis Jean.
- Viré, Marie-Madeleine (1992). "La cathédrale à Entrevaux". Annales de Haute-Provence, Société scientifique et littéraire des Alpes-de-Haute-Provence. Vol. I Les cathédrales.
