= Alet-les-Bains =

Commune in Occitanie, France

- Commune
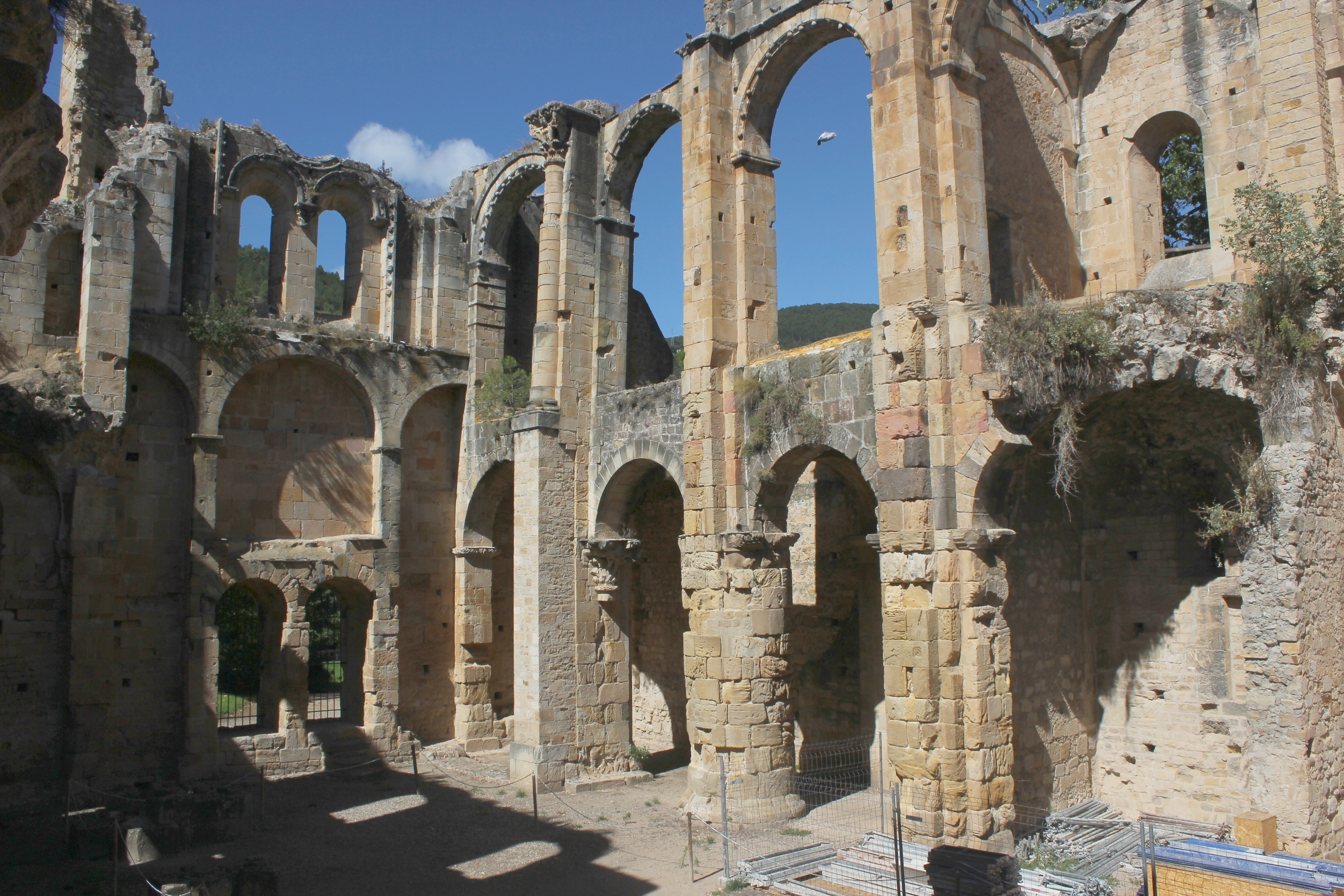
- The ruins of the abbey in Alet-les-Bains

- Coat of arms
- Location of Alet-les-Bains
- Location within France Location within Occitanie
- Coordinates: 42°59′51″N 2°15′25″E
- Country: France
- Region: Occitania
- Department: Aude
- Arrondissement: Limoux
- Canton: La Région Limouxine
- Intercommunality: Limouxin

Government
  - Mayor (2020–2026): Ghislaine Tafforeau
- Area^{1}: 23.54 km^{2} (9.09 sq mi)
- Elevation: 204 m (669 ft)
- Highest elevation: 720 m (2,360 ft)
- Lowest elevation: 180 m (590 ft)
- Population (2023): 379
  - Density: 16.1/km^{2} (41.7/sq mi)
- Time zone: UTC+01:00 (CET)
  - Summer (DST): UTC+02:00 (CEST)
- INSEE/Postal code: 11008 /11580
- ^{1} French Land Register data, which excludes lakes, ponds, glaciers > 1 km^{2} (0.386 sq mi or 247 acres) and river estuaries.

Alet-les-Bains (French pronunciation: [alɛt le bɛ̃]; Alet in Occitan, formerly spelt Aleth) is a commune in the Aude department in the Occitanie region in southern France.

== Geography ==
Alet-les-Bains is located near a hot springs in Aude in the south of France. The village is roughly one and a half hours from the sea and one hour from a winter sports centre. To each side of the village, the mountains come to a height of 750 metres above sea level. Access to the SNCF (French National Railway Company) can be found at the Alet-les-Bains train station.

== History ==
The origins of the abbey of Alet-les-Bains are unknown other than that of a priory in the eighth century. It was likely founded by Béra, viscount of Razés. By the twelfth century, it had much influence and many pilgrims. In 1318, the abbey became a bishopric in order to continue the fight against the Cathars; as it stayed until the French Revolution. The diocese had eighty Parishes and spanned from Formiguères to Saint-Paul-de-Fenouillet. A wall, with four gates, built in the twelfth century to protect the abbey can still be seen today.

In the sixteenth century, during the wars of religion, the Huguenots burnt and destroyed the abbey. In the seventeenth century, Nicolas Pavillon, bishop of Alet who stood up against the government of Louis XIV; could have found the means to repair the abbey, but did not feel that given the poverty of the people in his diocese, it would be acceptable. He did, however, build a bridge that spans Aude, in 1662 and gave an improved system of irrigation, as well as a seminar.

The thirty-fifth and last bishop of Alet, Charles de la Cropte de Chanterac, who opened the "Grande route" (Big road) Limoux-Quillan, also built a new portion of the bishopric, which he attached to the oldest part of the bishopric, which dates from the twelfth century and is now preserved. By climbing a flight of stairs, one would come to the first floor where one can see the beautiful and large synod hall as well as the library. The bishopric and its three hectares of gardens span a large portion of the old abbey.

By the separation of church and state, the bishopric became the property of the persons who lived in his estates, which were dispersed around the region. The buildings were used until the beginning of this century.

In the 21st century many British people moved to Alet.

== Administration ==
The current mayor is Ghislaine Tafforeau, who entered office in 2014 and was re-elected in 2020. The previous mayor, Jean-Denis Alandry, had been in office since 2001.

== Population ==
Historical population
| Year | Pop. | ±% p.a. |
|---|---|---|
| 1968 | 590 | — |
| 1975 | 554 | −0.90% |
| 1982 | 543 | −0.29% |
| 1990 | 460 | −2.05% |
| 1999 | 464 | +0.10% |
| 2007 | 439 | −0.69% |
| 2012 | 439 | +0.00% |
| 2017 | 406 | −1.55% |
| 2023 | 379 | −1.14% |
Source: INSEE

== Sights ==
- Abbey and cathedral of the seventh century.
- Medieval, fortified castle.
- Hotels of the twelfth and fourteenth centuries.
- Source of thermally heated water, discovered by the Romans over two thousand years ago.
- Thermal spa.

== Economy ==
The water of Alet-les-Bains is one of the oldest sold mineral waters in France, first bottled over 120 years ago, it is one of the largest sources in France. The village is very lively and possesses a casino, a thermal spa, several hotels, and several boutiques. There is one shop, which is a grocery store and a cafe serving breakfast and hot lunches.

== Events and festivals ==
There are several festivals throughout the year: la Fête des Remparts in July organised by Animalet; the Association des Artistes Aletois organises a three-day music series "Alet en Concert" the weekend of Pentecost which is May 22-24th in 2026 and a week-long art exhibition "Expressions" mid-August.

== Personalities ==
- Nicolas Pavillon was the bishop of Alet in the seventeenth century.
- Roger Peyrefitte 1907 - 2000, author.

== See also ==
- Communes of the Aude department
