= Entrevaux =

- Commune
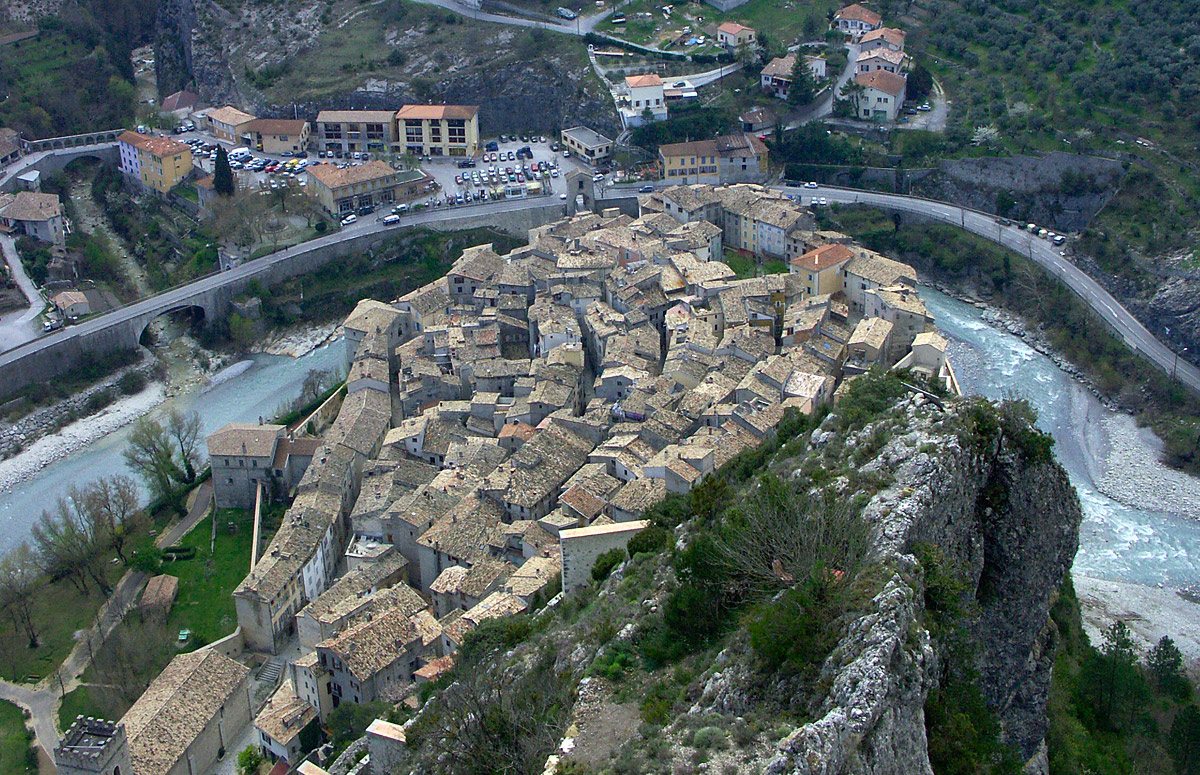
- A view from the citadel, overlooking Entrevaux

- Coat of arms
- Location of Entrevaux
- Location within France Location within Provence-Alpes-Côte d'Azur
- Coordinates: 43°56′58″N 6°48′39″E
- Country: France
- Region: Provence-Alpes-Côte d'Azur
- Department: Alpes-de-Haute-Provence
- Arrondissement: Castellane
- Canton: Castellane

Government
  - Mayor (2026–32): Didier Occelli
- Area^{1}: 60.37 km^{2} (23.31 sq mi)
- Elevation: 472 m (1,549 ft)
- Highest elevation: 1,541 m (5,056 ft)
- Lowest elevation: 414 m (1,358 ft)
- Population (2023): 769
  - Density: 12.7/km^{2} (33.0/sq mi)
- Time zone: UTC+01:00 (CET)
  - Summer (DST): UTC+02:00 (CEST)
- INSEE/Postal code: 04076 /04320
- ^{1} French Land Register data, which excludes lakes, ponds, glaciers > 1 km^{2} (0.386 sq mi or 247 acres) and river estuaries.

Entrevaux (French pronunciation: [ɑ̃tʁəvo]; Occitan: Entrevaus) is a commune (municipality), former episcopal seat (not bishopric in title; that remained the Diocese of Glandèves) and Latin Catholic titular see in the Alpes-de-Haute-Provence department in southeastern France. It is a member of Les Plus Beaux Villages de France (The Most Beautiful Villages of France) Association.

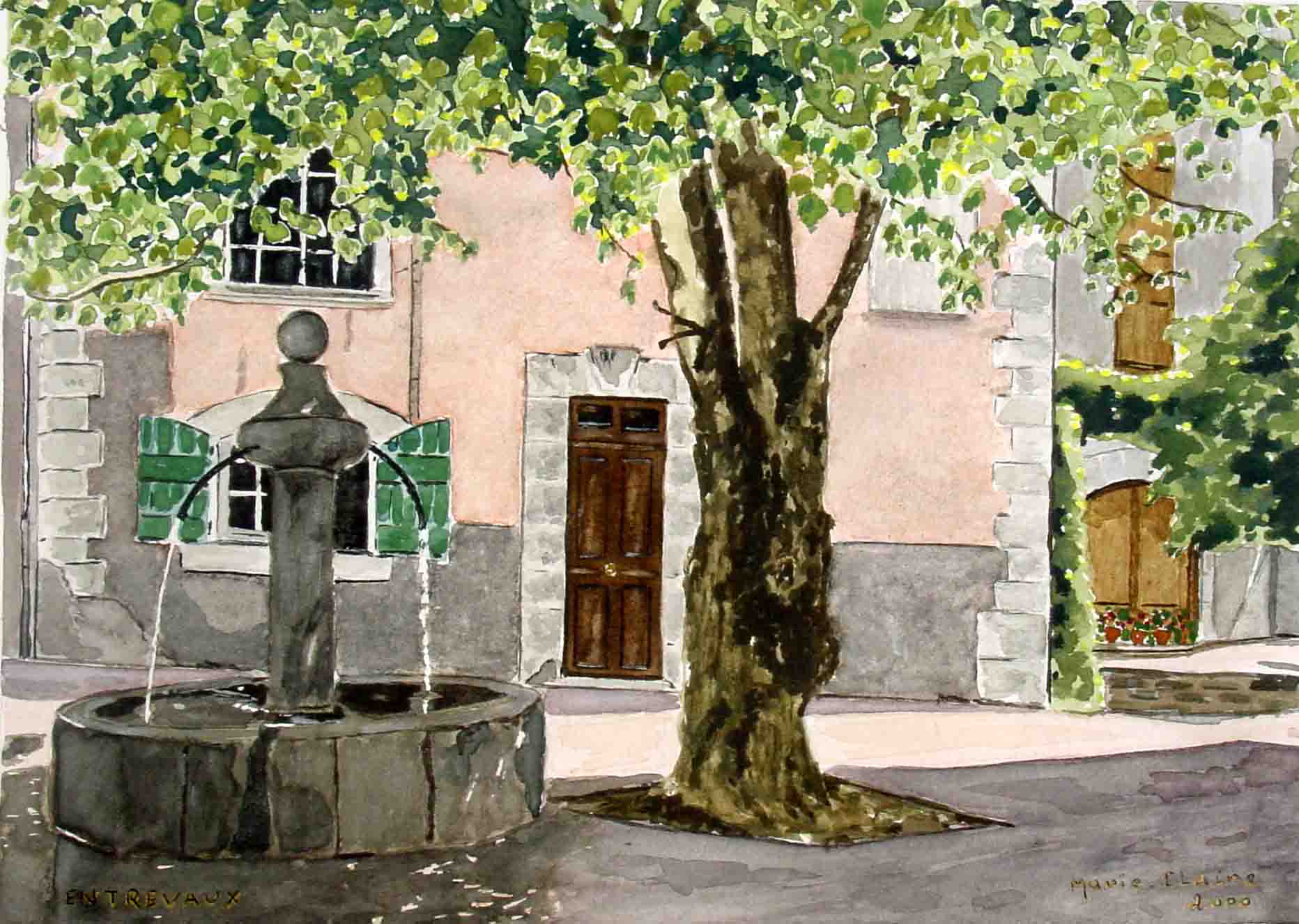
Place Charles Panier.

== Geography ==
Set on both sides of the narrow road between Annot and Puget-Théniers that runs alongside the gorge of the river Var, the medieval walled town lies in the shadow of a mountaintop citadel.

== History ==
Following incursions of Saracens and the razing of the old town of Glandèves, which became a bishopric no later than the sixth century, the more defensible site of medieval Entrevaux was founded in the 11th century on the rocky spur in an angle of the river; the oldest recorded name is Interrivos and dates from 1040.

Between 1481 and 1487, Provence became a part of France.

In 1536, Entrevaux fell to the troops of Charles V, Holy Roman Emperor, betrayed by its lord Jacques Glandeves; half the population was massacred (coll.). The remaining population staged an uprising, cutting the throat of the governor, and offered the town to the French Dauphin, King François I. In recognition of this, Entrevaux was given the Municipal charter (city law model) of Avignon and declared a royal town of France, with its inhabitants exempt from taxation.

In the 16th century, the bishop's official seat at the Glandèves Cathedral in Glandèves was abandoned, and a new one, Entrevaux Cathedral, was constructed in Entrevaux though still the seat of the Bishop of Glandèves. It served as a cathedral until 1790, but the see persisted until 1801.

In 1658 a bridge guarded by towers and a portcullis was constructed over the Var; this is the modern Porte Royale. In 1690 the military architect Vauban drew up plans to further fortify the town, due to its strategic position guarding the valley of the Var and on the border with Savoy. Although not completed in full, the citadel perched high above the town was strengthened, particularly on the more accessible side closest to the hilltops, and a protected walkway constructed up the side of the mountain from the town. Two small forts were provided to protect the town, and its two main gates—now called the Porte d'Italie and the Porte de France—strengthened.

Entrevaux was briefly besieged in June 1707 by the royalist Savoyards under Chevalier Blaignac, but resisted and was relieved by the French forces.

The citadel was last used during World War I as a prison for German officers.

In 2009 the medieval diocese of Glandèves was nominally restored as Latin Titular bishopric of Episcopal (lowest) rank, but under the present names of Entrevaux (French)/Intervallen(sis) (Latin).

== Population ==
Historical population
| Year | Pop. | ±% p.a. |
|---|---|---|
| 1968 | 677 | — |
| 1975 | 686 | +0.19% |
| 1982 | 698 | +0.25% |
| 1990 | 785 | +1.48% |
| 1999 | 742 | −0.62% |
| 2007 | 901 | +2.46% |
| 2012 | 933 | +0.70% |
| 2017 | 852 | −1.80% |
| 2023 | 769 | −1.69% |
Source: INSEE

== Sights ==
Entrevaux features a pilgrimage of St John on the weekend closest to 24 June, and an annual medieval festival on the weekend closest to 15 August (Le Monti). An unusual feature is a motorcycle museum with a working collection of over 100 early, mostly European models, including Solex motorised bicycles. Outside the city walls, a working 19th-century oil mill is still in production and can be visited.

The cathedral houses a large painting of the Assumption of the Virgin by François Mimault from 1647, as well as an organ by Jean Eustache dating to 1717.

== Transportation ==
Entrevaux may be reached by the mountain train from Nice to Digne-les-Bains run by the Chemins de Fer de Provence. In summer, a restored 19th-century steam train runs between Annot and Puget-Théniers.

== Cuisine ==
Regional culinary specialities include Secca de boeuf (dried beef, served in wafer-thin slices), pain d'épice (gingerbread), and honey.

== See also ==
- Communes of the Alpes-de-Haute-Provence department

== Sources and external links ==
- Medieval city of Entrevaux
- Fortifications of Entrevaux
- Photos of Entrevaux
