= Calvi Cathedral =

Former Roman Catholic church in Corsica, France

Coordinates: 42°34′06″N 8°45′38″E

Calvi Cathedral Pro-cathédrale Saint-Jean-Baptiste de Calvi
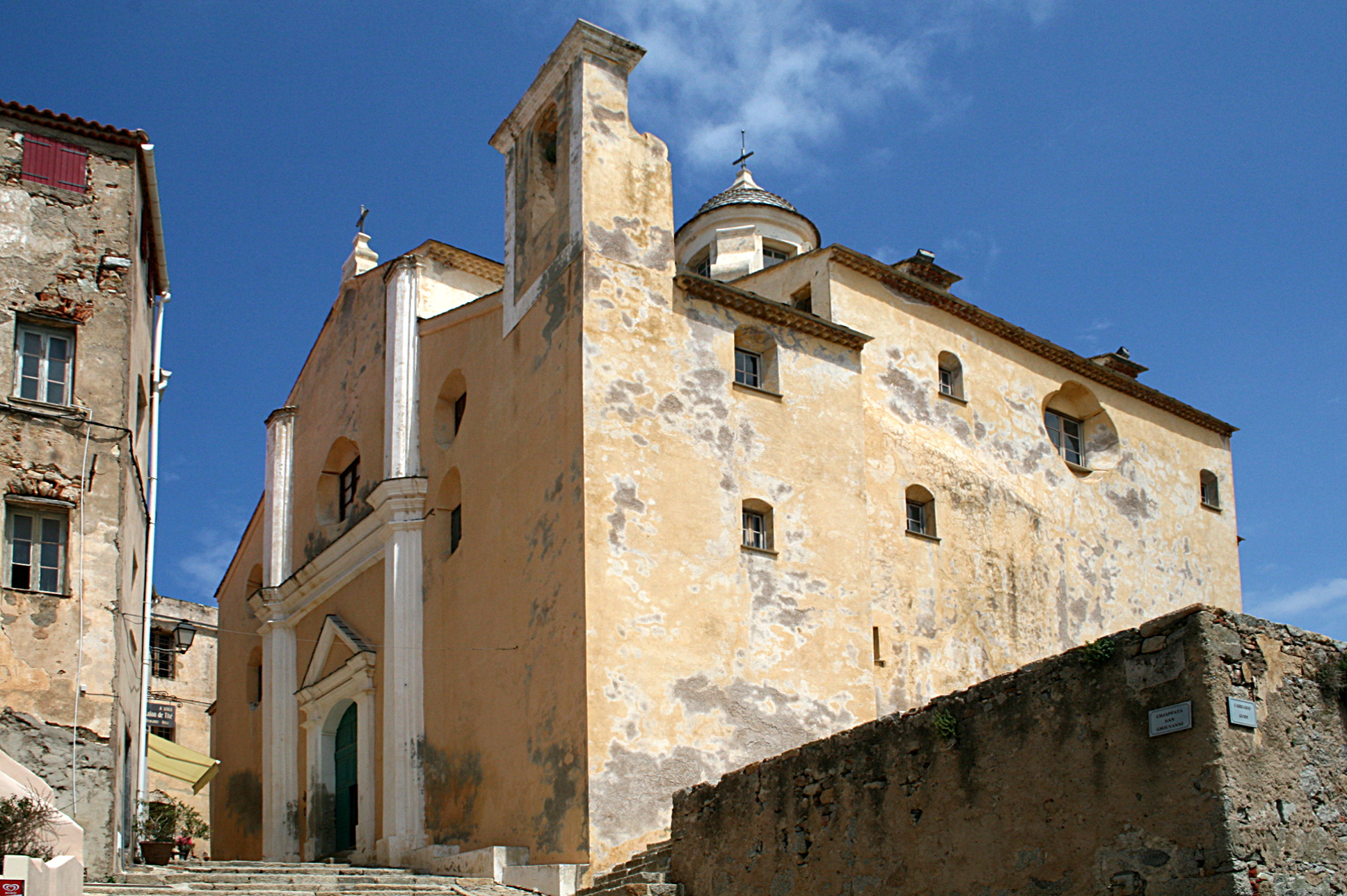
- Calvi Cathedral

Religion
- Affiliation: Roman Catholic Church
- Province: Bishopric of Ajaccio
- Region: Corsica
- Rite: Roman
- Ecclesiastical or organisational status: Cathedral
- Status: Active

Location
- Location: Calvi, France
- Interactive map of Calvi Cathedral; Pro-cathédrale Saint-Jean-Baptiste de Calvi

Architecture
- Type: church

Calvi Cathedral (Pro-cathédrale Saint-Jean-Baptiste de Calvi) is a former Roman Catholic church located in Calvi on the island of Corsica, France. It was the episcopal seat of the Bishop of Sagona, which in 1801 was succeeded by the Bishopric of Ajaccio. The cathedral is a national monument.

== Sources and external links ==
- Catholic Encyclopedia: Corsica
- Location
