= Aleth Cathedral =

Cathedral in Saint-Servan, France

Coordinates: 48°38′9″N 2°1′37″W

Aleth Cathedral Cathédrale Saint-Pierre d'Aleth
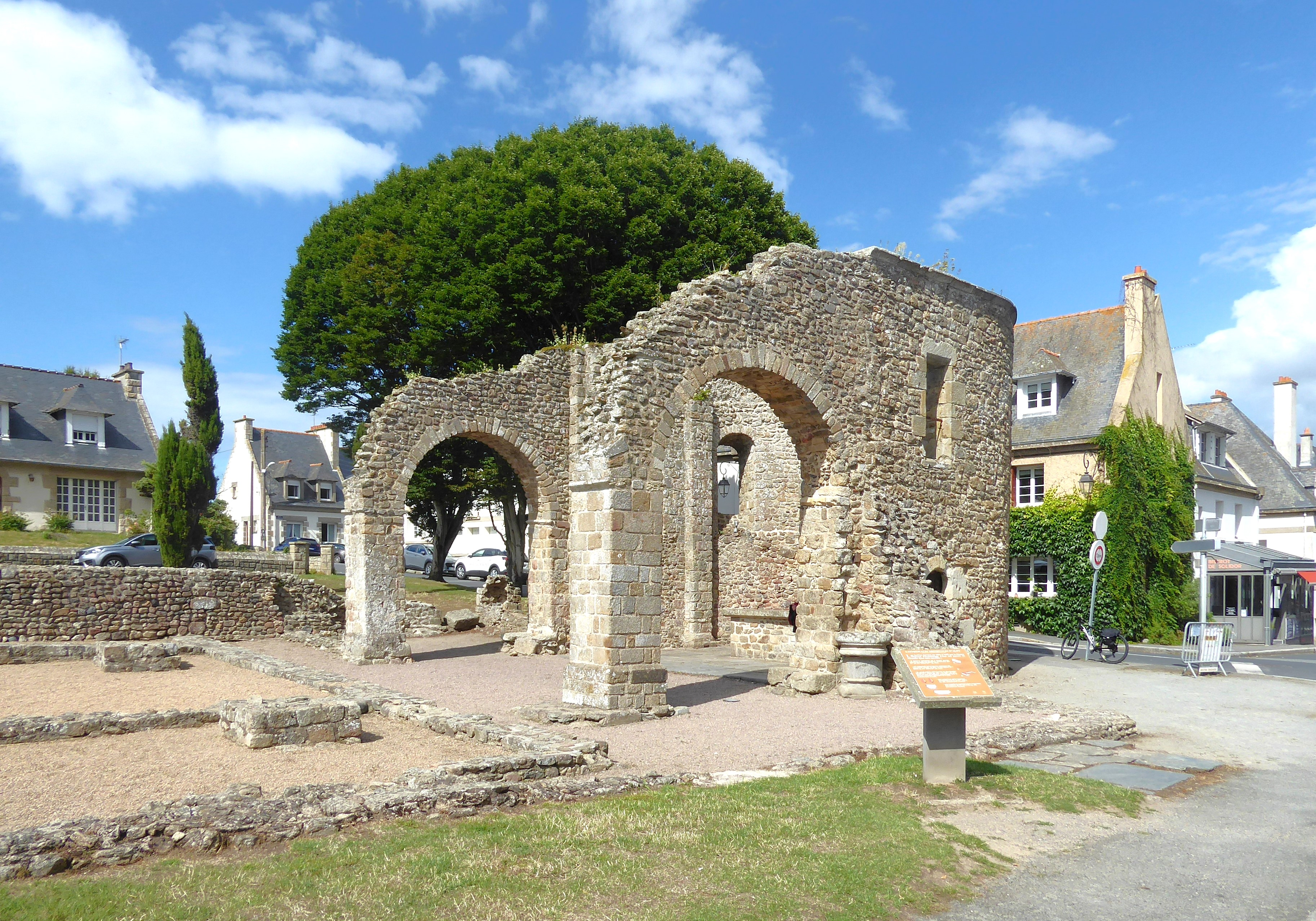
- Ruins of Aleth Cathedral in Saint-Servan

Religion
- Affiliation: Roman Catholic Church
- Province: Diocese of Saint-Malo
- Region: Ille-et-Vilaine
- Rite: Roman
- Ecclesiastical or organisational status: Cathedral
- Status: Active

Location
- Location: Saint-Servan, France
- Interactive map of Aleth Cathedral; Cathédrale Saint-Pierre d'Aleth

Architecture
- Type: church
- Style: Gothic, Romanesque
- Groundbreaking: 9th century
- Completed: 12th century

Aleth Cathedral (French: Cathédrale Saint-Pierre d'Aleth) was a Roman Catholic church located in Saint-Servan in Saint-Malo, Brittany, France. It was the cathedral of the diocese of Aleth.

Aleth was a Gallo-Roman settlement on a peninsula on one side of the Rance estuary. The diocese was established in the 9th century. The cathedral was destroyed by Norman invaders in the 10th century but later rebuilt.

The site of Aleth however was not a secure one and the town of Saint-Malo had begun to grow up on a far more defensible site on a rocky islet in the estuary. In 1146 the seat of the bishopric of Aleth was moved to Saint-Malo by the then bishop, Jean de Châtillon, and established in the monastery, founded in 1108. The diocese thus became the Diocese of Saint-Malo and the abbey church Saint-Malo Cathedral, replacing the cathedral in Aleth.

Competition with the new town came to a head in 1255, when resentment in Aleth at the tax demands of Saint-Malo resulted in armed conflict. Aleth lost, and the walls, fortress and church were dismantled as punishment. The former cathedral ruins are still to be seen in the commune of Saint-Servan which occupies the area of the former Aleth.
