= Louis-Alphonse de Valbelle =

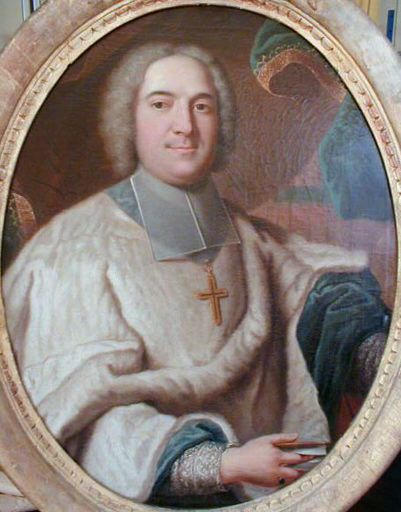
- Born: 1640; Marseille, Bouches-du-Rhône, Provence-Alpes-Côte d'Azur, France
- Died: October 19, 1708 (aged 67–68); Saint-Omer, Pas-de-Calais, Nord-Pas-de-Calais, France
- Occupation: Bishop
- Parent: Antoine de Valbelle
- Relatives: Léon de Valbelle de Montfuron (brother)

Louis-Alphonse de Valbelle (1640–1708) was a French Roman Catholic Bishop.

== Biography ==
=== Early life ===
Louis-Alphonse de Valbelle was born in 1640 in Marseille. His father was Antoine de Valbelle. He had a brother, Léon de Valbelle de Montfuron.

=== Career ===
He served as the Bishop of Alet from 1677 to 1684 and as Bishop of Saint-Omer from 1684 to 1708.

=== Death ===
He died in 1708 in Saint-Omer.
