= Roman Catholic Diocese of Glandèves =

Roman Catholic diocese in France

Coordinates: 43.89°N 7.25°E

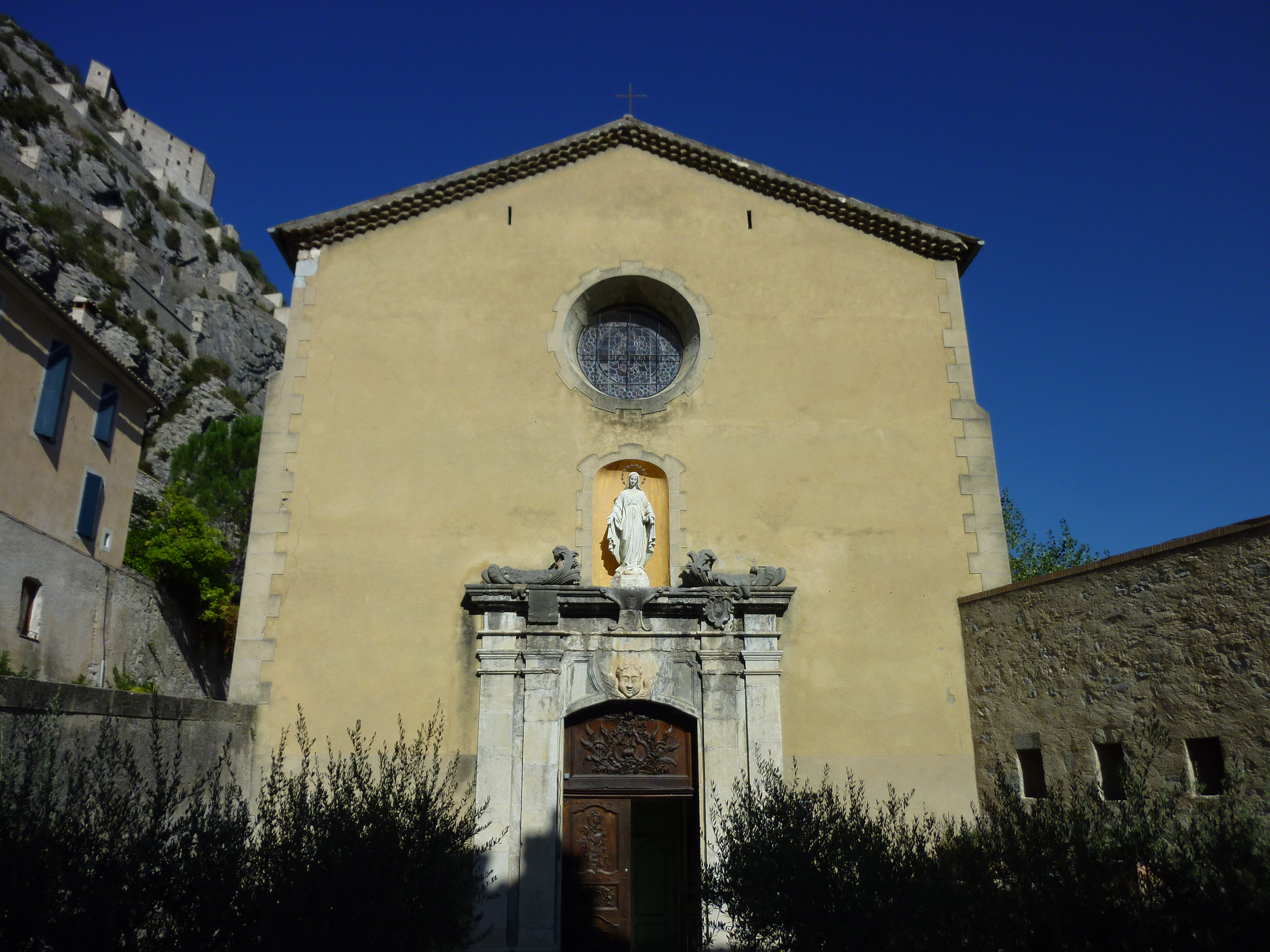
Entrevaux Cathedral

Glanate was a Gallo-Roman town on the right bank of the Var, which became the episcopal see of Glandève.

== Ancient history ==
The site was first occupied by Ligurians, probably the Oxybii, in the 6th century BCE; they traded with Massallia (ancient Marseilles) and cultivated vines and olives (coll.)

By the 3rd century BCE, the Celto-Ligurian town had taken shape. Its name, in Gaulish, means "a habitation on the riverbank". In 125 BCE, the Romans under Octavian annexed Provence and the undefended site of Glanate surrendered. In time, Glanate acquired the status of a Roman town. (coll., Le Monti)

In 406, the Burgundians pillaged the town.

== Feudal and ecclesiastical history ==
Glanate, known by late Antiquity as Glandèves became a bishopric; the first known bishop was Fraternus in 451 (Le Monti), or Claudius, who ascended the episcopal throne in 541, but Glandèves was probably a see as early as 439.

Over the next two centuries, raids by the Burgundians, Francs and Lombards gradually destroyed the town, which was also sacked by the Saracens from 700 until they were driven from Provence by William of Arles in 973.

Despite this destruction, Glandèves continued to be a bishopric until the 17th century. However, the population moved to the nearby and much more defensible site of Entrevaux from the start of the 11th century.

Among its bishops were Symphorien Bullioud (1508–20), also ambassador from Francis I of France to Pope Julius II and chaplain to Francis I; Francis I Faure (1651–53), the pulpit orator, later Bishop of Amiens, and Jean-Baptiste de Belloy (1752–55), who died a centenarian in 1808, as Archbishop of Paris.

By the Concordat of 1801, the diocese of Digne was made to include the two departments of the Hautes and Basses Alpes, in addition to the former diocese of Digne, the Archdiocese of Embrun, the dioceses of Gap, Sisteron and Senez, a very considerable part of the diocese of Glandèves and the diocese of Riez, and fourteen parishes in the Archdiocese of Aix and the Diocese of Apt. In 1822 Gap was made an episcopal see and, thus divested of the department of the Hautes Alpes, the present diocese of Digne covers the territory formerly included in the dioceses of Digne, Senez, Glandèves, Riez, and Sisteron.

== Bishops ==
- Fraterne 451
- Claude 541
- Basile 549,554
- Promotus 573
- Agrèce 585–588
- Guy (Hugo) 975 or 991–1012
- Pons I. 1020 or 1029–1056 or 1057
- Pons II. D'Aicard 1091, 1095
- Peter I. 1095–1103?
- Hubert 1108, 1146
- Isnard I. 1149, 1165
- Raimond 1179
- Isnard Grimaldi 1190
- Peter II. 1213–1225
- P. (Peter or Pons) 1238–1245
- Manuel 1246,1253
- Bonifatius? 1289, 1290
- Wilhelm 1294–1308
- Anselm Féraud de Glandèves 1309 or 1316–1327 or 1328
- Jacques de Moustiers 1328 or 1329–1340 or 1345
- Hugues 1345
- Bernard 1353–1365
- Elzéar D'Albe 1365–1367
- Bertrand Lagier (Latgier) 1368–1372 or 1378
- Jean I. 1372 or 1375–1391 or 1402
- Herminc de Viscarustède 1391 to c. 1404
- Johann Bonifatius I. 1404 or 1405–1415 or 1426
- Louis de Glandèves 1415–1420
- Paul du Caire 1420–1424 or 1427–1446
- Johann Bonifatius II. 1425 to c. 1445
- Pierre Marini 1447–1465 or 1445–1457
- Marin 1457 to c. 1467
- Jean Inguimbert de Montigny 1468–1469
- Mariano de Latvo 1470–1494 or 1469–1492
- Christophe de Latvo 1493–1509
- Symphorien Bullioud 1509–1520
- Philippe du Terrail 1520–1532
- Jacques du Terrail 1532–1535
- Louis de Charny 1535–1539
- Imbert Isserand 1539–1548
- Martin Bachet 1550 to c. 1555 or 1564–1572
- Aimar de Maurigon 1548–1564 or 1557–1564
- Hugolin Martelli 1572 to c. 1592
- Clément Isnard 1593–1604 or 1612
- Octave Isnard 1605 or 1612–1625
- René Leclerc 1627–1651
- François Faure 1651–1652 or 1654
- Jean-Dominique Ithier 1654–1672
- Leon Bacoué 1672–1685
- François Verjus 1685–1686
- Charles de Villeneuve de Vence 1686–1702
- César de Sabran 1702–1720
- Dominique-Laurent-Balbe de Berton de Crillon 1721–1747
- André-Dominique-Jean-Baptiste de Castellane 1748–1751
- Jean-Baptiste de Belloy-Morangle 1751–1755 (also Bishop of Marseille)
- Gaspard de Tressemanes de Brunet 1755–1771
- Henri-Hachette Desportes 1771–1798

== See also ==
- Catholic Church in France
- List of Catholic dioceses in France

== Bibliography ==
Sources

- Gams, Pius Bonifatius (1873). Series episcoporum Ecclesiae catholicae: quotquot innotuerunt a beato Petro apostolo. Ratisbon: Typis et Sumptibus Georgii Josephi Manz. (Use with caution; obsolete)
- Eubel, Conradus, ed. (1913). Hierarchia catholica, Tomus 1 (second ed.). Münster: Libreria Regensbergiana. (in Latin)
- Eubel, Conradus, ed. (1914). Hierarchia catholica, Tomus 2 (second ed.). Münster: Libreria Regensbergiana. (in Latin)
- Gulik, Guilelmus (1923). Eubel, Conradus (ed.). Hierarchia catholica, Tomus 3 (second ed.). Münster: Libreria Regensbergiana.
- Gauchat, Patritius (Patrice) (1935). Hierarchia catholica IV (1592-1667). Münster: Libraria Regensbergiana.
- Ritzler, Remigius; Sefrin, Pirminus (1952). Hierarchia catholica medii et recentis aevi V (1667-1730). Patavii: Messagero di S. Antonio.
- Ritzler, Remigius; Sefrin, Pirminus (1958). Hierarchia catholica medii et recentis aevi VI (1730-1799). Patavii: Messagero di S. Antonio.

Additional sources

- Duchesne, Louis (1910). Fastes épiscopaux de l'ancienne Gaule: II. L'Aquitaine et les Lyonnaises. Paris: Fontemoing.
- Du Tems, Hugues (1774). Le clergé de France, ou tableau historique et chronologique des archevêques, évêques, abbés, abbesses et chefs des chapitres principaux du royaume, depuis la fondation des églises jusqu'à nos jours (in French). Vol. Tome premier. Paris: Delalain.
- Jean, Armand (1891). Les évêques et les archevêques de France depuis 1682 jusqu'à 1801 (in French). Paris: A. Picard. p. 78.
