= Nicolas Pavillon =

French bishop

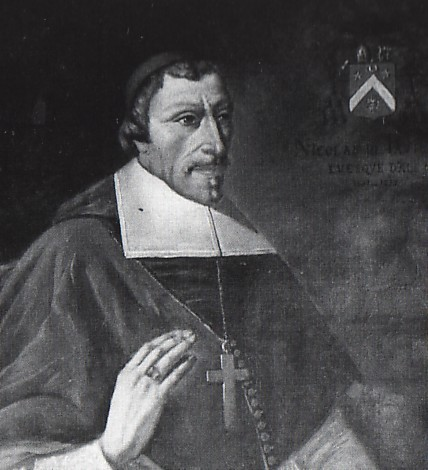
Nicolas Pavillon

Nicolas Pavillon (1597 at Paris – 1677 at Alet) was a French bishop of Alet and Jansenist. His attitude against Pope Alexander VII won him the admiration of Port-Royal. Alet became the "Mecca" of the Jansenists. His nephew was the writer Étienne Pavillon.

== Life ==
He joined the community of St-Lazare, founded by Vincent de Paul, and, for a time, devoted himself to charities and preaching. His zeal and eloquence caused Richelieu to appoint him to the See of Alet. The thirty-seven years of his episcopate were filled with ceaseless labours for the religious and moral improvement of his diocese; visitation of parishes, holding of synods, and foundation of schools.

He opposed pope and king. He was one of the four bishops who refused to sign the formulary imposed by Alexander VII, on the plea that the pope cannot pronounce on facts but only on rights. When Louis XIV commanded submission to the papal order, Pavillon in Lettre au roi" (1664) declined to recognize his interference. The royal attempt at extending to all the provinces of France the so-called droit de regale found in Pavillon a sturdy opponent. He spurned royal threats and ecclesiastical censures and appealed to the pope against both the King of France and the Metropolitan of Narbonne.

From the data of a contemporary pamphlet (Factum de Messire Vincent Ragot, Paris, 1766) Toreilles shows the effects of Jansenist principles on every branch of Pavillon's diocesan administration and on his relations with the nobility, the clergy, the regulars, and the peasantry.

== Works ==
He wrote Rituel d'Alet (Paris, 1666), condemned by Pope Clement IX, and Ordonnances et status synodaux (Paris, 1675).
