= Exuperius =

Bishop of Toulouse

Saint Exuperius
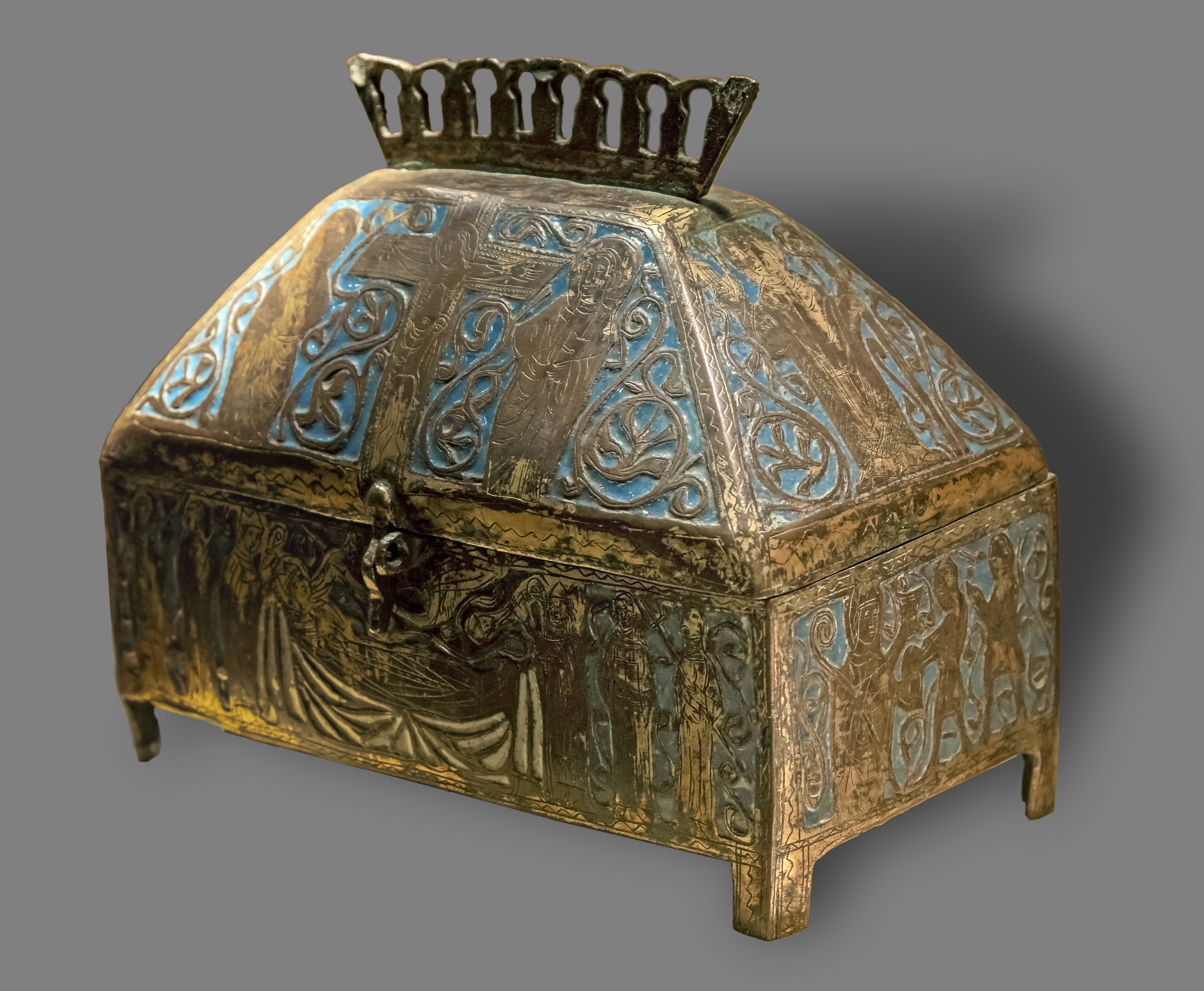
- 13th century reliquary holding Exuperius' relics. Musée Paul Dupuy, Toulouse.

Bishop
- Born: unknown
- Died: c. 410
- Major shrine: Toulouse
- Feast: 28 September

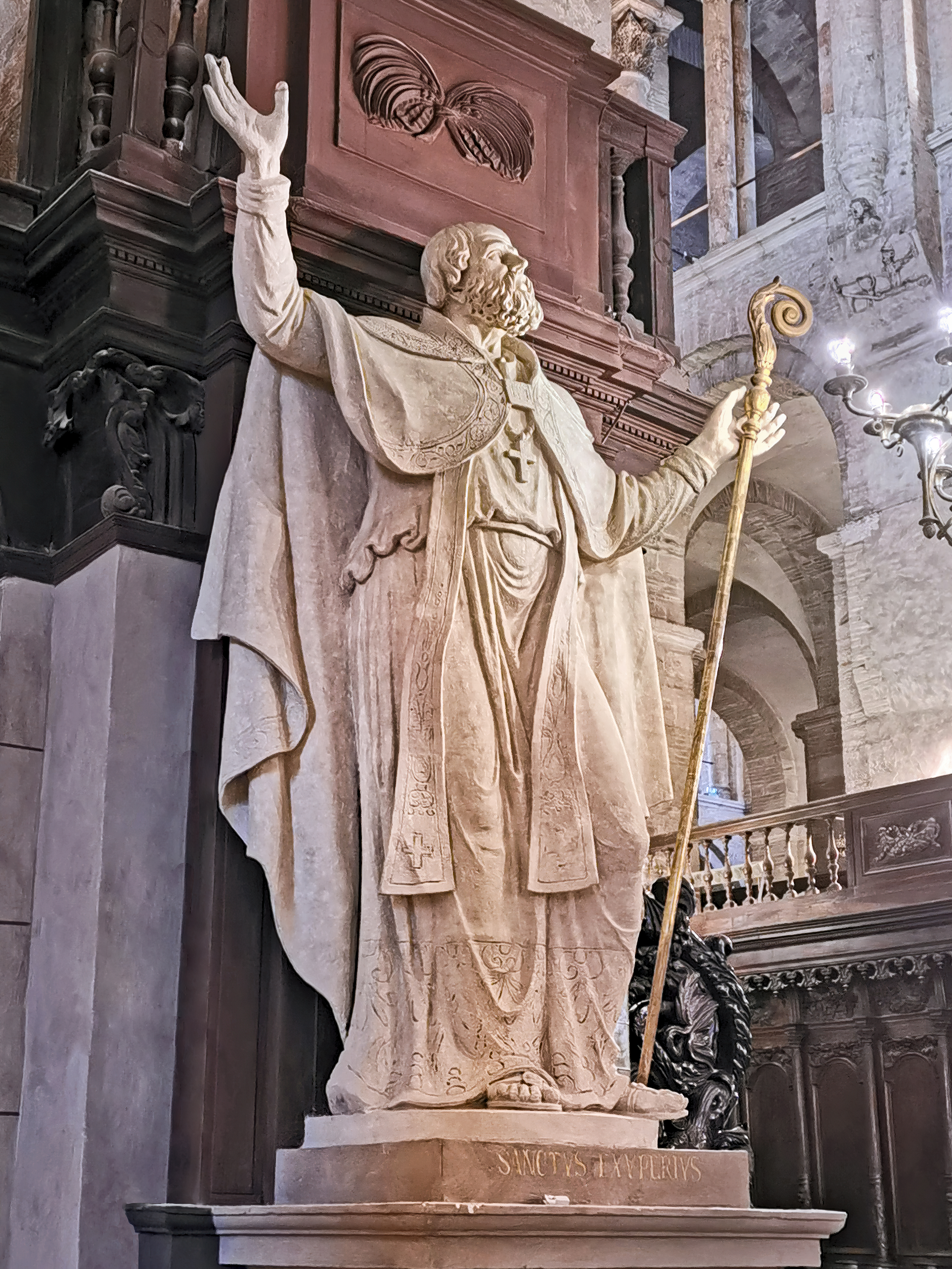
Sculpture of Saint Exuperius in the Basilica of St. Sernin, Toulouse.

Exuperius (also Exsuperius) (French: Saint Exupéry, Saint Soupire) (died c. 410) was Bishop of Toulouse at the beginning of the 5th century.

== Life ==
His place and date of birth are unknown. Upon succeeding Sylvius as bishop of Toulouse, he ordered the completion of the basilica of St. Saturnin, a part of which was incorporated into the Basilica of St. Sernin. Jerome praised Exuperius "for his munificence to the monks of Palestine, Egypt, and Libya, and for his charity to the people of his own diocese, who were then suffering from the attacks of the Vandals, Alans, and Suevi." On behalf of the poor in his diocese he sold the basilica's altar vessels and was therefore compelled to carry the Sacred Offering in an osier basket and the Precious Blood in a vessel of glass. In respect of his virtues and in gratitude for his gifts, Jerome dedicated his Commentary on Zacharias to him.

Exuperius is best known in connection with the biblical canon. He had written to Pope Innocent I for instructions concerning the canon and several points of ecclesiastical behaviour. In reply, the Pope honoured him with the letter Consulenti Tibi, dated 20 February 405, which contained a list of the canonical scriptures.

The opinion of Baronius, that bishop Exuperius was the same person as the rector with the same name, is usually rejected, as the rector was a teacher of Hannibalianus and Dalmatius, nephews of Constantine the Great, and therefore from an earlier period than the bishop. From Jerome's letter to Furia in 394, and from the epistle of Paulinus to Amandus of Bordeaux in 397, it seems probable that Exuperius was a priest at Rome, and later at Bordeaux before he was raised to the episcopate—though it is possible that in both of these letters reference is made to a different person.

The precise date of his promotion to the bishop is unknown. Evidence suggests that he occupied the See of Toulouse in February 405 (as is evident from the letter of Innocent I mentioned above). It is sometimes said that Jerome reproached him in a letter to Riparius, a priest of Spain, for tolerating the heretic Vigilantius; but as Vigilantius did not belong to the diocese of Toulouse, Jerome was probably speaking of another bishop.

Exuperius was venerated as a saint from early times. In the time of Gregory of Tours he was held in equal veneration with Saturninus. His feast occurs on 28 September. The first martyrologist to assign it to this date was Usuard, who wrote towards the end of the 9th century.
