= Jean d'Orleans =

Jean d'Orleans or John of Orléans may refer to:

- John, Count of Angoulême (1399-1467)
- Jean de Dunois (1402-1468)
- Jean d'Orléans-Longueville (1484-1533)
- Jean d'Orléans, duc de Guise (1874-1940)
- Jean d'Orléans (1965-), Orléanist claimant
- Master of the Parement, French painter in Paris under the reign of Charles V. about 1370 - 1400
