= André Collini =

French Roman Catholic priest

- Archbishop of Toulouse
- Church: Catholic Church
- Archdiocese: Archdiocese of Toulouse
- In office: 16 November 1978 – 3 December 1996
- Predecessor: Louis-Jean Guyot
- Successor: Émile Marcus
- Previous posts: Titular Archbishop (pro hac vice) of Salapia (1972-1978); Coadjutor Archbishop of Toulouse (1972-1978); Bishop of Ajaccio (1966-1972); Titular Bishop of Zephyrium (1962-1966); Coadjutor Bishop of Ajaccio (1962-1966)

Orders
- Ordination: 20 September 1947
- Consecration: 7 October 1962 by Maurice Perrin

Personal details
- Born: André Charles Collini; 18 November 1921 Tunis, Regency of Tunis, France
- Died: 10 November 2003 (aged 81) Lourdes, Hautes-Pyrénées, France

André Charles Collini (18 November 1921 – 10 November 2003) was a French Roman Catholic priest. He served as Bishop of Ajaccio from 1966 to 1972 and as Archbishop of Toulouse from 1978 to 1996.

== Early life ==
Collini was born in Tunis, Tunisia (then a French protectorate) to a family of European settlers (Pieds-Noirs). His father was a court clerk. In 1943, while Collini was a student at the Seminary of Tunisia, he joined the French army. Collini was ordained in 1947 after the Second World War.

== Career ==
On 7 September 1962 Collini was named honorary bishop of Zephirium and bishop coadjutor of the Bishop of Ajaccio Jean-Baptiste Llosa. Collini was ordained Bishop on 7 October 1962, at the Saint Louis Cathedral in Carthage, Tunisia. At 41, he was the youngest French bishop at the time. Four days later, he took part in the Second Vatican Council (1962-1965). He was appointed Bishop of Ajaccio on 26 July 1966.

After he was appointed coadjutor of the Archbishop of Toulouse Jean Guyot on 21 December 1972, Collini became Archbishop of Toulouse on 16 November 1978.

== Views ==
Bishop Collini was notable for his involvement in ecumenism. He took progressive positions on the ordination of married men and condom use.

== Death ==
In December 1996, Collini resigned as archbishop and retired to Notre-Dame de la Paix in Lagardelle-sur-Lèze. He died in Lourdes on 10 November 2003. He was buried in the southern vault of the choir at the Saint-Étienne cathedral of Toulouse.

== Honors ==
- Knight of the Legion of Honour.
- Médaille Militaire
- Croix de Guerre 1939–1945.
