= Sylvius of Toulouse =

French saint and bishop

Saint Sylvius of Toulouse
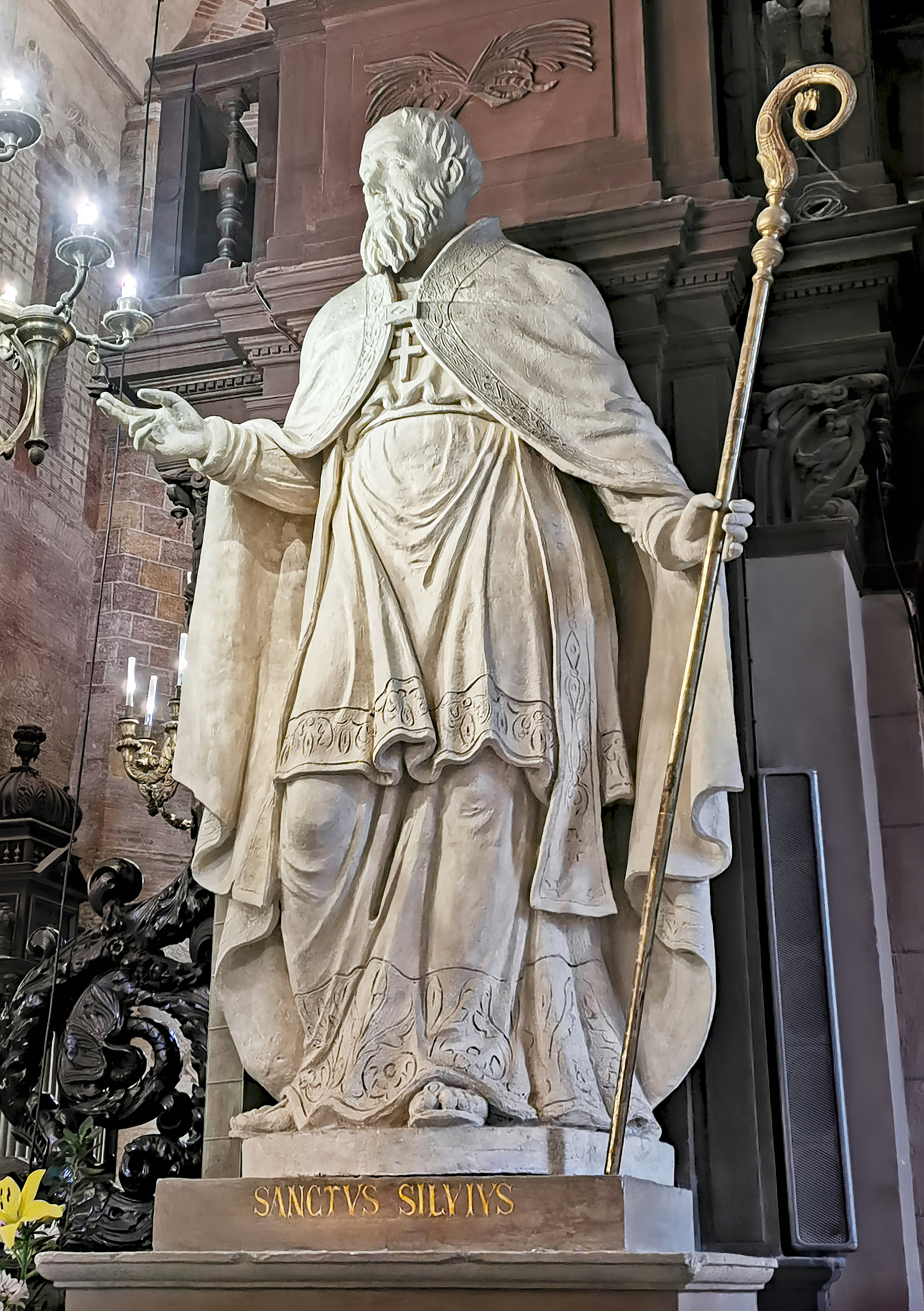
- Statue of St. Sylvius. Basilica of St. Sernin, Toulouse.

Bishop
- Born: unknown
- Died: c. 400 AD
- Major shrine: Basilica of St. Sernin, Toulouse.
- Feast: May 31

Sylvius of Toulouse (Silvius, French: Sylve) was bishop of Toulouse from 360 AD to 400 AD. He was succeeded by Exuperius. Sylvius began construction of the basilica of St. Sernin of Toulouse towards the end of the 4th century. The church was later completed by his successor Exuperius. Sylvius' remains were later transferred to the church he had begun.

His feast day is on May 31
