= Erembert of Toulouse =

Merovingian nobleman, bishop and saint

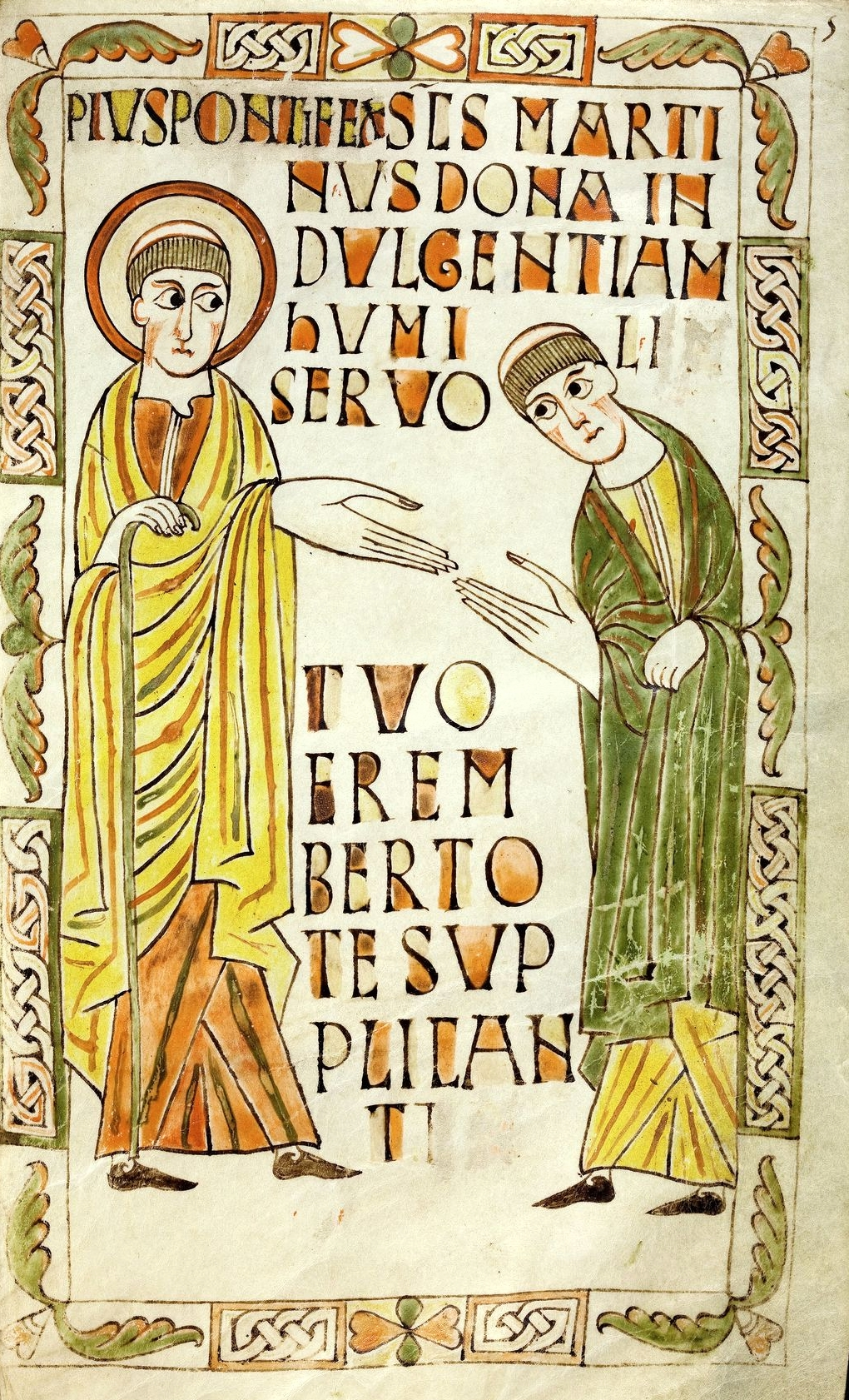
Bishop Erembert, asking for mercy, towards Saint Martin

Saint Érembert (610-670), son of a Merovingian nobleman, was Bishop of Toulouse. Érembert was born in the valley of Feuillancourt, near current town of Saint-Germain-en-Laye, where there is a priory dedicated to Saint Saturnin, the first Bishop of Toulouse.

He became a monk at the Abbey of Fontenelle where he received the habit of St. Benedict from Saint Wandrille. He was a disciple of Saint Lambertus, then abbot and later Bishop of Lyon. In 656, Chlothar III appointed him bishop of Toulouse, a position he held for ten years before returning to his original monastery.

According to his hagiography, Érembert’s miracle was the extinguishing of a raging fire, trapping a crowd in the basilica, by just his staff.
