= Basilica of Saint-Sernin, Toulouse =

Large Romanesque-style building in France

Basilica of Saint-Sernin Basilique Saint-Sernin de Toulouse Basilica de Sant Sarnin de Tolosa
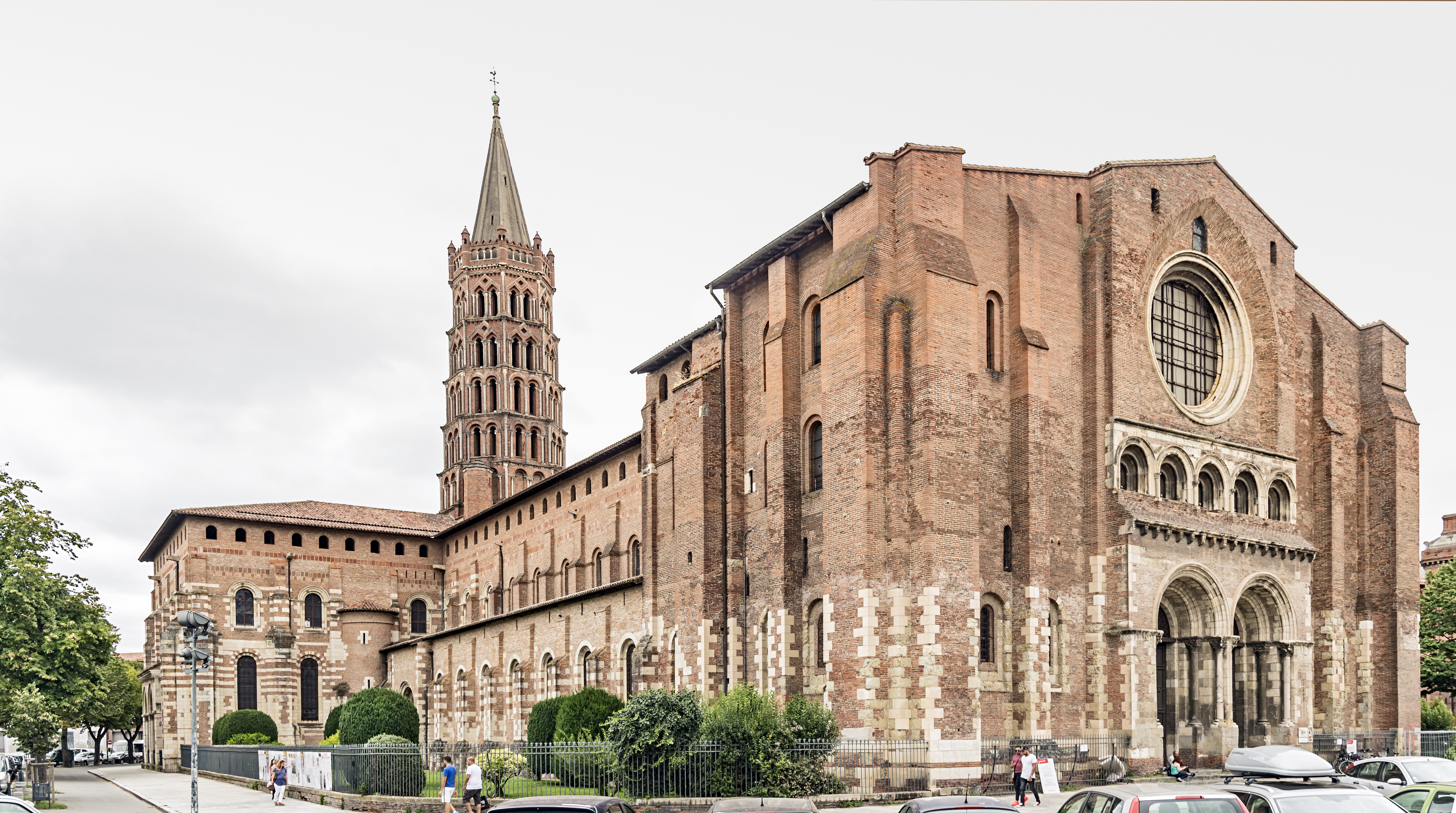
- Western entrance of the basilica.

Religion
- Affiliation: Roman Catholic
- Ecclesiastical or organisational status: Minor basilica
- Year consecrated: 1096

Location
- Location: Toulouse
- Interactive map of Basilica of Saint-Sernin; Basilique Saint-Sernin de Toulouse; Basilica de Sant Sarnin de Tolosa
- Coordinates: 43.6084°N 1.4420°E

Architecture
- Style: Romanesque
- UNESCO World Heritage Site
- Type: Cultural
- Criteria: ii, iv, vi
- Designated: 1998 (22nd session)
- Parent listing: Routes of Santiago de Compostela in France
- Reference no.: 868
- State Party: France
- Region: Europe and North America

The Basilica of Saint-Sernin (Occitan: Basilica de Sant Sarnin) is a church in Toulouse, France, the former abbey church of the Abbey of Saint-Sernin or St Saturnin. Apart from the church, none of the abbey buildings remain. The current church is located on the site of a previous basilica of the 4th century which contained the body of Saint Saturnin or Sernin, the first bishop of Toulouse in c. 250. The church is particularly noted for the quality and quantity of its Romanesque sculpture. In 1998 the basilica was added to the UNESCO World Heritage Sites under the description: World Heritage Sites of the Routes of Santiago de Compostela in France.

== History ==
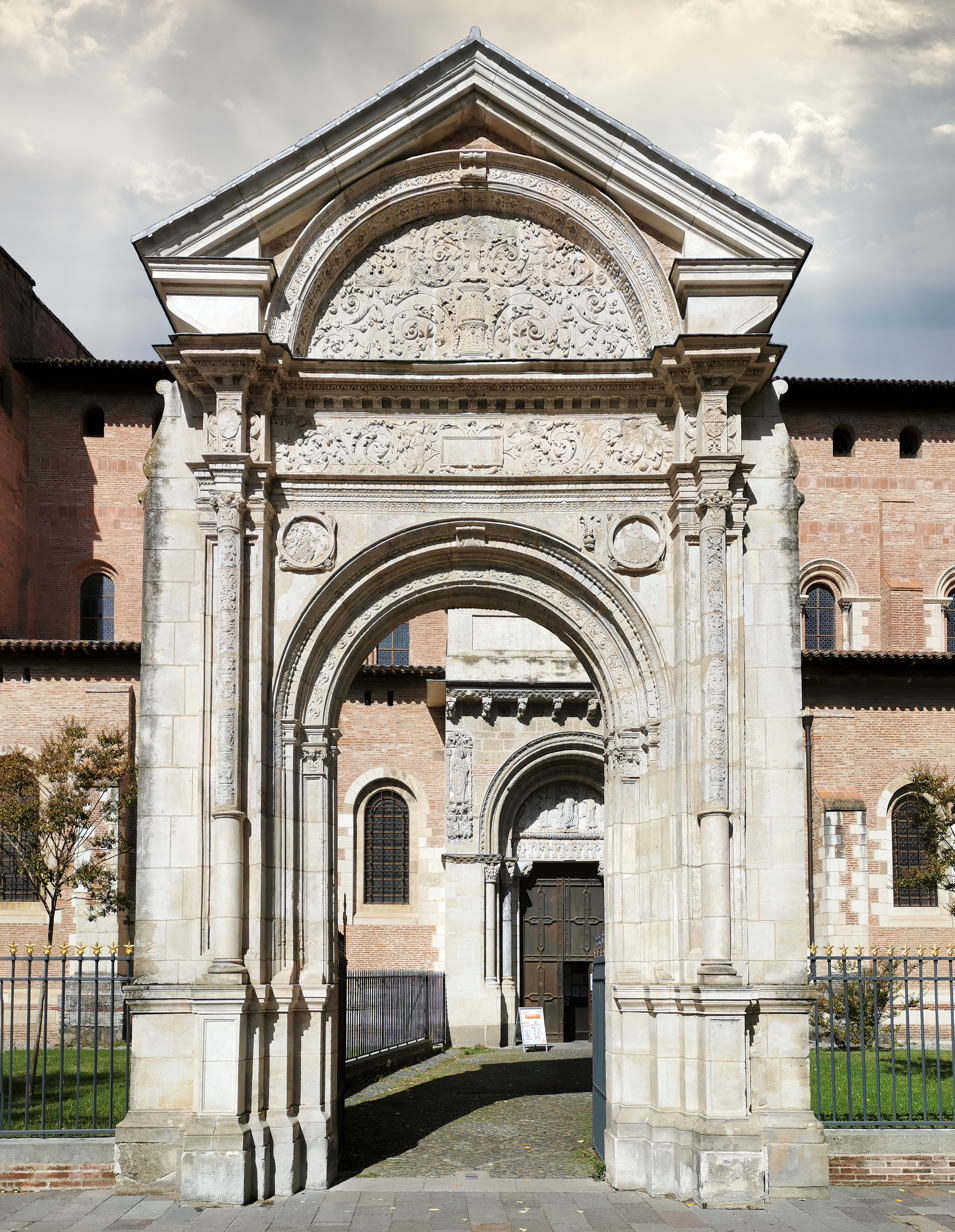
Renaissance door of the abbey

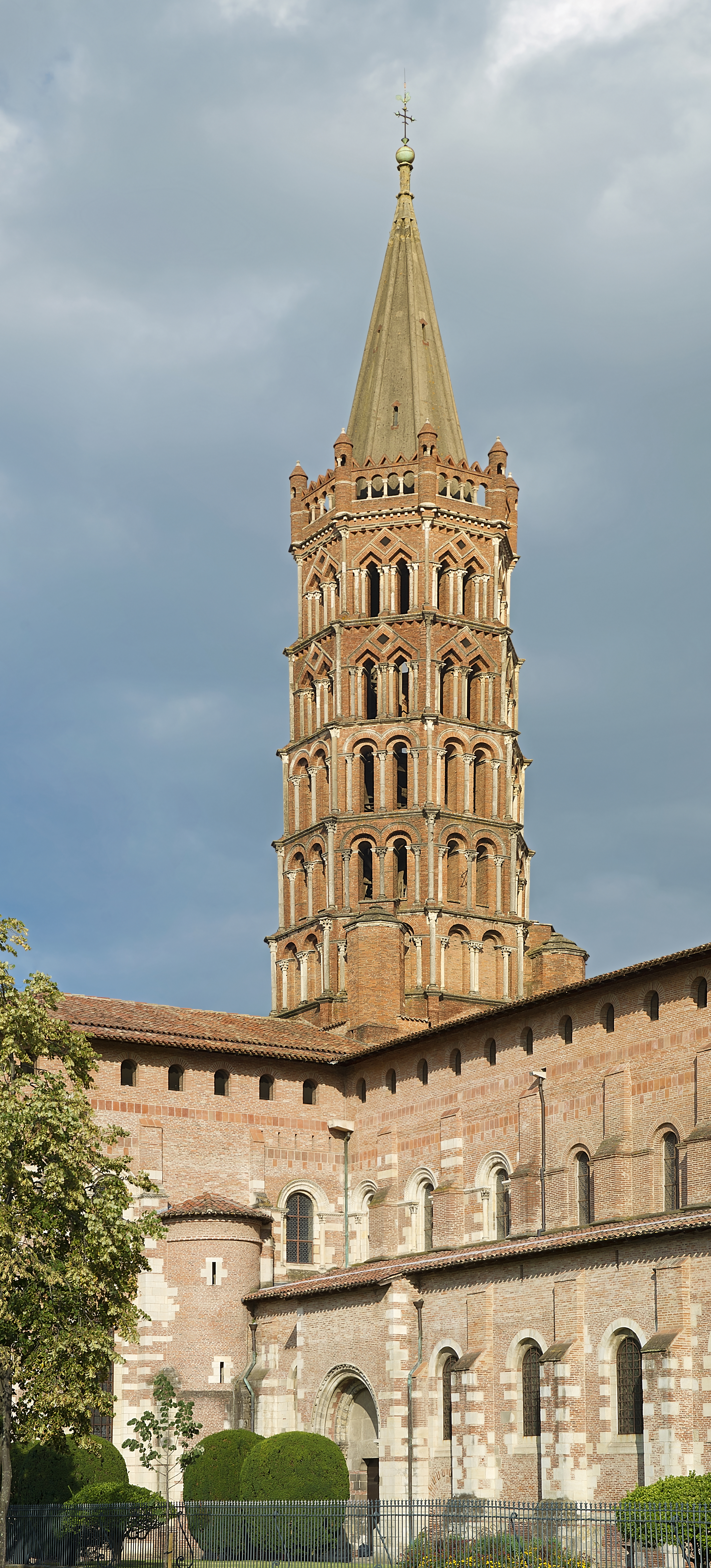
Bell tower (The lower part Romanesque and Gothic upper part

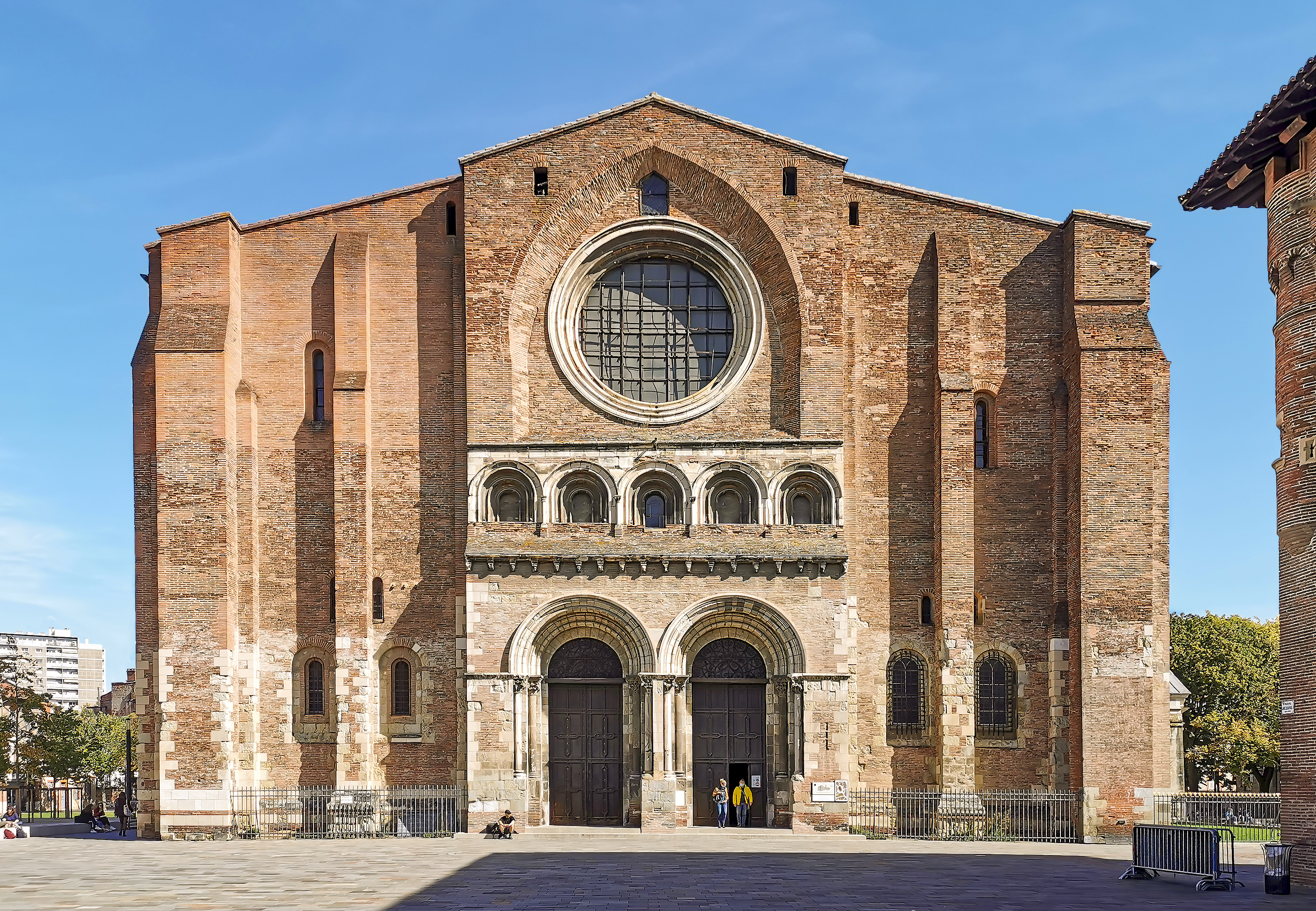
Façade

The abbey of Saint-Sernin was an ancient foundation. St. Sylvius, bishop of Toulouse, began construction of the basilica towards the end of the 4th century.

Its importance increased enormously after Charlemagne (r. 768–800) donated a quantity of relics to it, as a result of which it became an important stop for pilgrims on their way to Santiago de Compostela, and a pilgrimage location in its own right. The size of the current building and the existence of an ambulatory may reflect the need to accommodate increasing numbers of pilgrims.

The difficulty of determining an accurate chronology for the construction of Saint-Sernin and the completion of its sculpture has given rise to numerous problems. At least as early as the 1010s, Bishop Pierre Roger had set aside a portion of the offerings to Saint-Sernin for an eventual rebuilding of the Carolingian church. During the decade of the 1070s and by 1080 at the latest, the canons of Saint-Sernin had accepted the rule of St. Augustine and had placed themselves under the direct control of the Holy See. Nevertheless, there are only two firm dates that bear directly on the church itself and even these involve certain difficulties. On May 24, 1096, Pope Urban II dedicated the altar of the still largely incomplete building. Although there have been numerous attempts to determine the point that construction had reached at this time, the most that can be said with certainty is that 1096 is a firm terminus ante quem. That is, construction must have begun at least several years before that date.

The second firm date is July 3, 1118, the death of St. Raymond Gayrard, canon and provost of the chapter. A 15th-century life of the saint states that he took charge of the building after part of the church had been completed and that by the time of his death he had "brought the walls all the way around up to the completion of the windows..." However, the life was written much later—some three hundred years after the events it describes—and since at least three different Raymonds were involved in the building of the church, the biographer may have confused elements from the lives of all three.

At any rate, whenever started, it appears that construction of the church did not progress continuously through to completion, for there is physical evidence of several interruptions in construction. The literary evidence cited above indicates that construction proceeded from east to west and, indeed, it appears that the earliest part of the exterior walls is the southern, lower part of the ambulatory and its corresponding radiating chapels. The walls in this section are built of brick and stone, with a higher proportion of stone than elsewhere in the building. As construction proceeded, it was clearly marked by an increasing proportion of brick, the characteristic building material of Toulouse. While there is basic agreement on the starting point, interpretation of the subsequent archeological evidence is subject to varying opinions. The earliest systematic examinations, after the restoration of Viollet-le-Duc, concluded that there had been three major building campaigns.

More recent observations have concluded that there were four major building campaigns. The earliest section begins with the apse and includes the chevet and all of the transept below the level of the gallery, including the Porte des Comtes in the south face of the transept. The second stage is marked by the walls of the transept being completed with alternating courses of brick and stone. This change is also paralleled by a change in the style of the interior decorated capitals. This break is most evident in the transept buttresses, which change from solid stone at the bottom to bands of brick and stone at the top, a change which occurs at various levels around the transept but generally about the level of the gallery floor. There then follows another break between the eastern portion of the church – including the transept and the first few bays of the nave itself – and the rest of the nave. The alternating courses of brick and stone give way to a predominantly brick technique with stone quoins and stone window frames. This third campaign includes the wall enclosing the entire nave, including the western entrance and ends just below the gallery windows. During the fourth phase, the remainder of the nave was completed in brick with almost no stone.

The plan of the abbey church here was also used in the construction of the cathedral of Santiago de Compostela, "begun in 1082, too direct a copy to have been done by any but Saint-Sernin's own architect or his favored pupil", but finished much earlier.

In 1860, Eugène Viollet-le-Duc restored the church, but his changes are currently being removed to restore the original appearance.

== Features ==
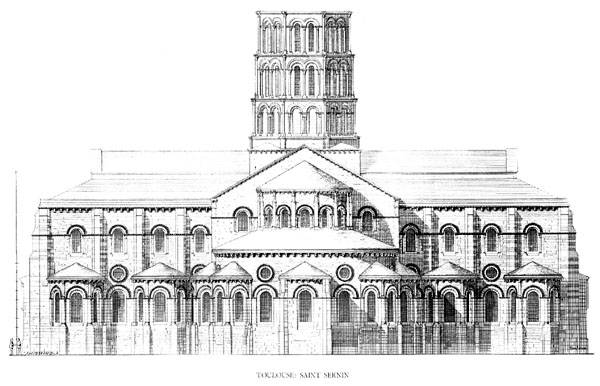
East end elevation of the basilica.

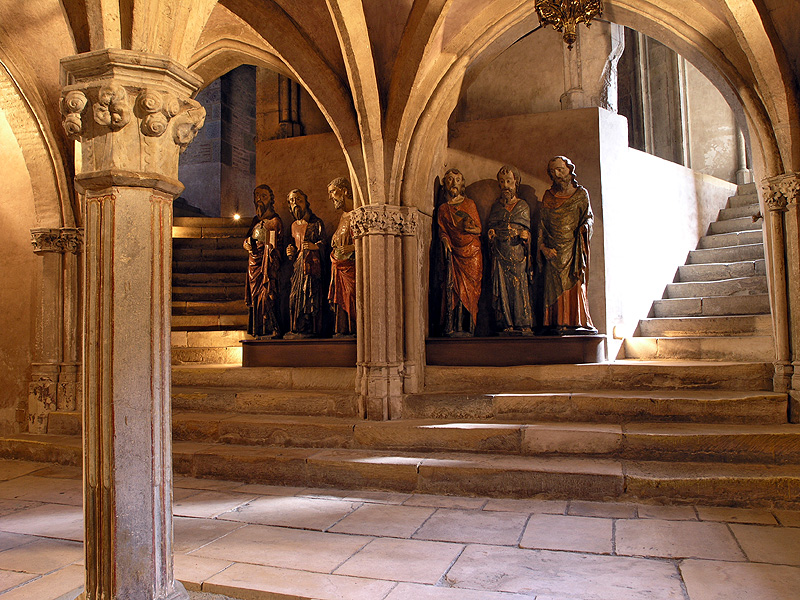
The crypt.

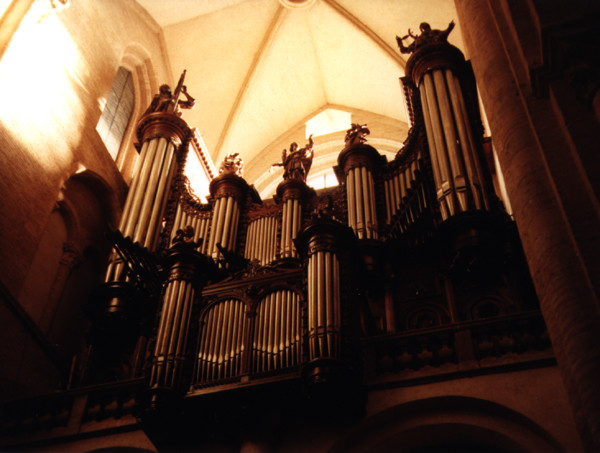
The grand 1888 Cavaillé-Coll organ

Despite being called a basilica, Saint-Sernin's deviates from the basilica plan of early Christian architecture in a few ways. It is much larger compared to earlier churches, measuring 104m in length. It is also constructed mostly of brick. The building is in the form of a crucifix. The ceilings are vaulted, unlike many of the earlier churches. Saint-Sernin's contains radiating chapels which were used to display important relics. Another deviation from the earlier Christian churches is the addition of an ambulatory, a walkway that goes around the nave and side aisles to allow for viewing of the radiating chapels (which could be done while mass was being held without interrupting the ceremony). For these and other reasons, Saint-Sernin's is often said to follow the "pilgrimage plan" instead of the traditional basilica plan.

=== Exterior ===
On the exterior, the bell tower, standing directly over the transept crossing, is the most visible feature. It is divided into five tiers, of which the lower three, with Romanesque arches, date from the 12th century and the upper two from the 13th century (circa 1270). The spire was added in the 15th century. The bell tower is slightly inclined towards the west direction, which is why from certain standpoints the bell tower roof, whose axis is perpendicular to the ground, appears to be inclined to the tower itself.

The chevet is the oldest part of the building, constructed in the 11th century, and consists of nine chapels, five opening from the apse and four in the transepts.

The exterior is additionally known for two doorways, the Porte des Comtes and the Porte Miègeville. Above the Porte des Comtes is a depiction of Lazarus and Dives. Dives in hell can be seen above the central column. The doorway gets its name from a nearby alcove in which the remains of four Counts of Toulouse are kept. The Porte Miègeville is known for its elaborate sculpture above the entrance: the ascending Christ, surrounded by superb angels, is the central figure on one of the oldest and most beautiful tympanums in Romanesque architecture (end of 11th c. or circa 1115).

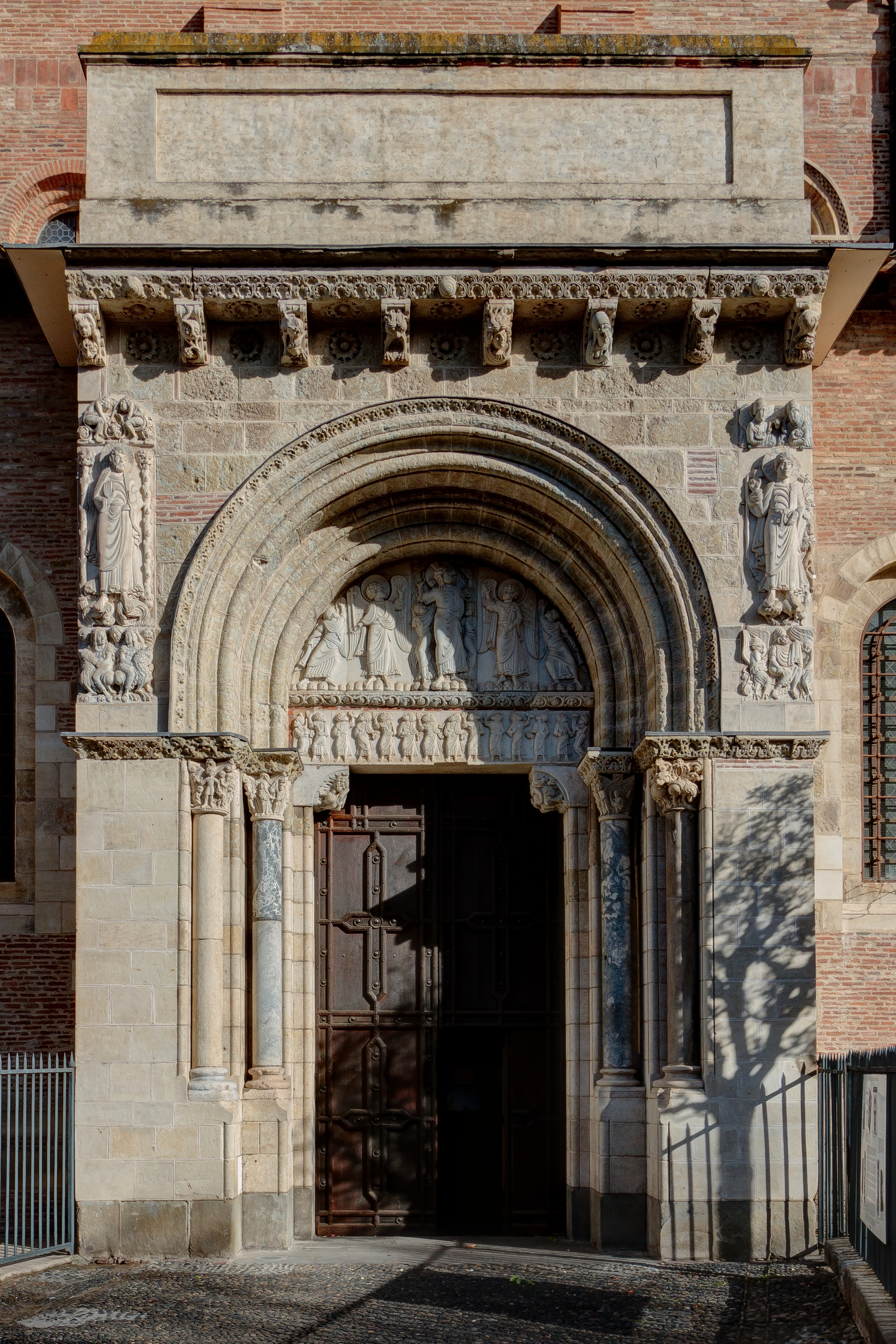
Porte Miègeville

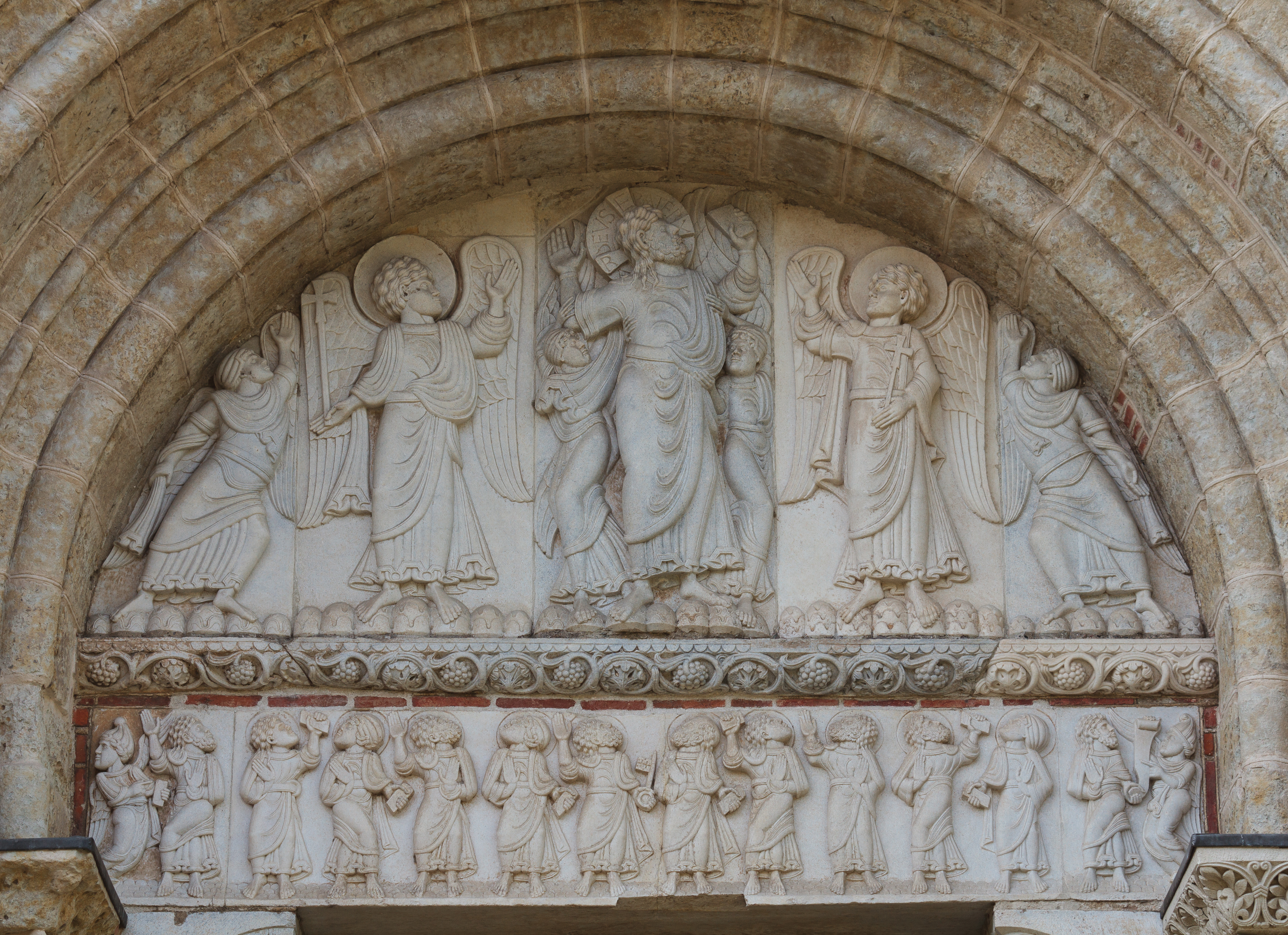
Tympanum of the Porte Miègeville

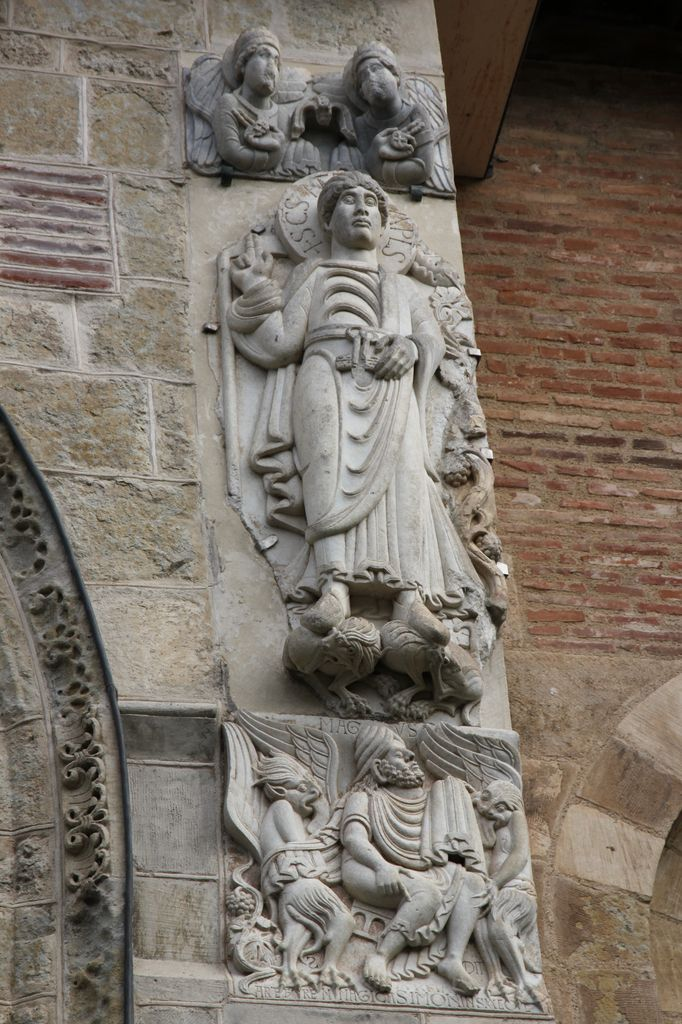
Saint Peter

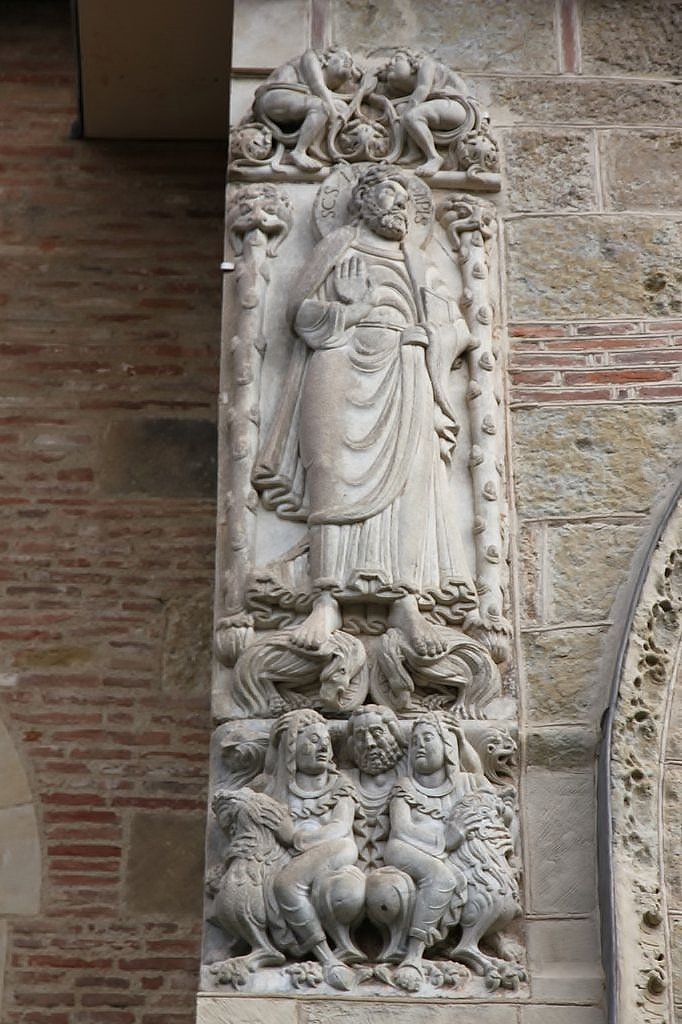
Saint James the Great

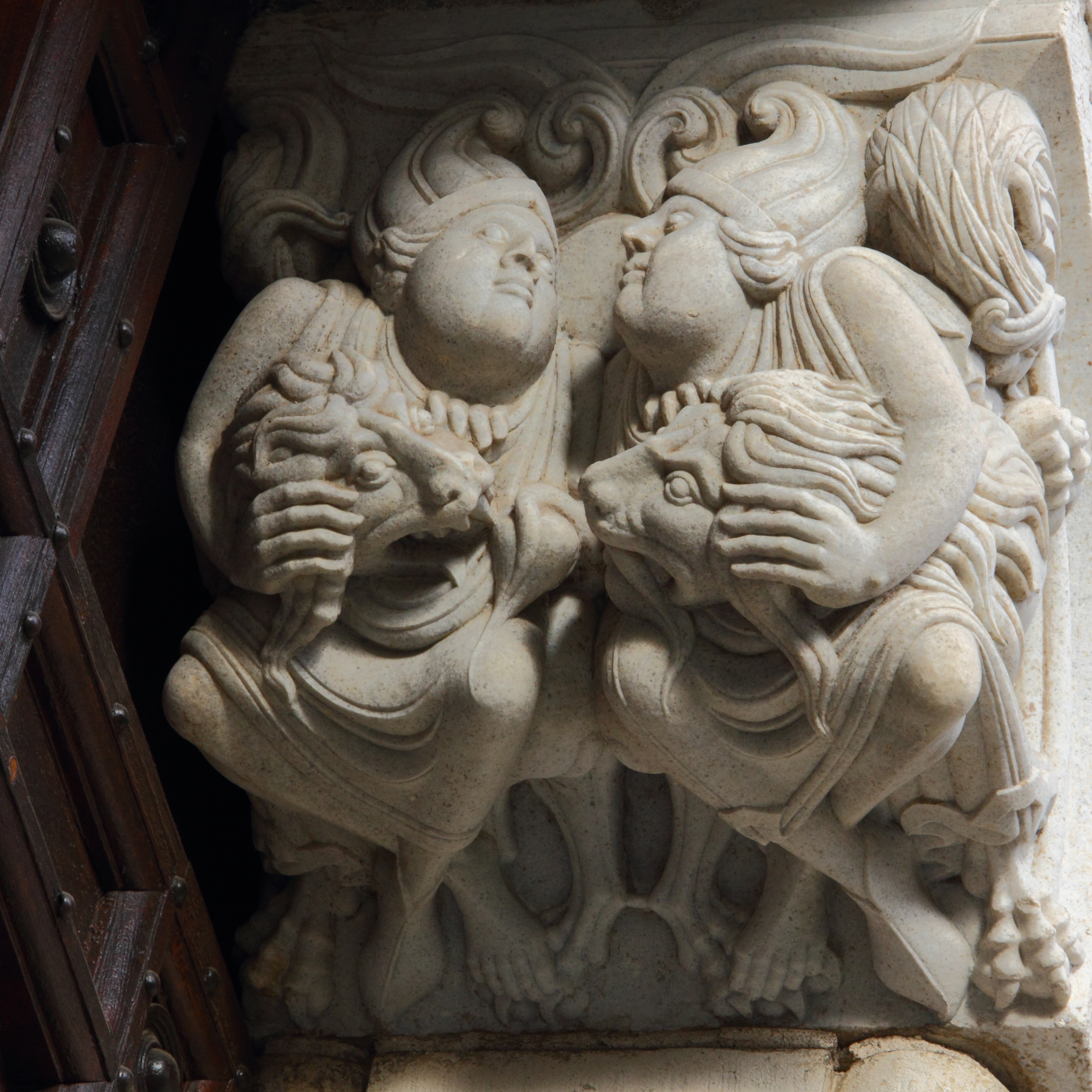
Two shepherds slaying lions

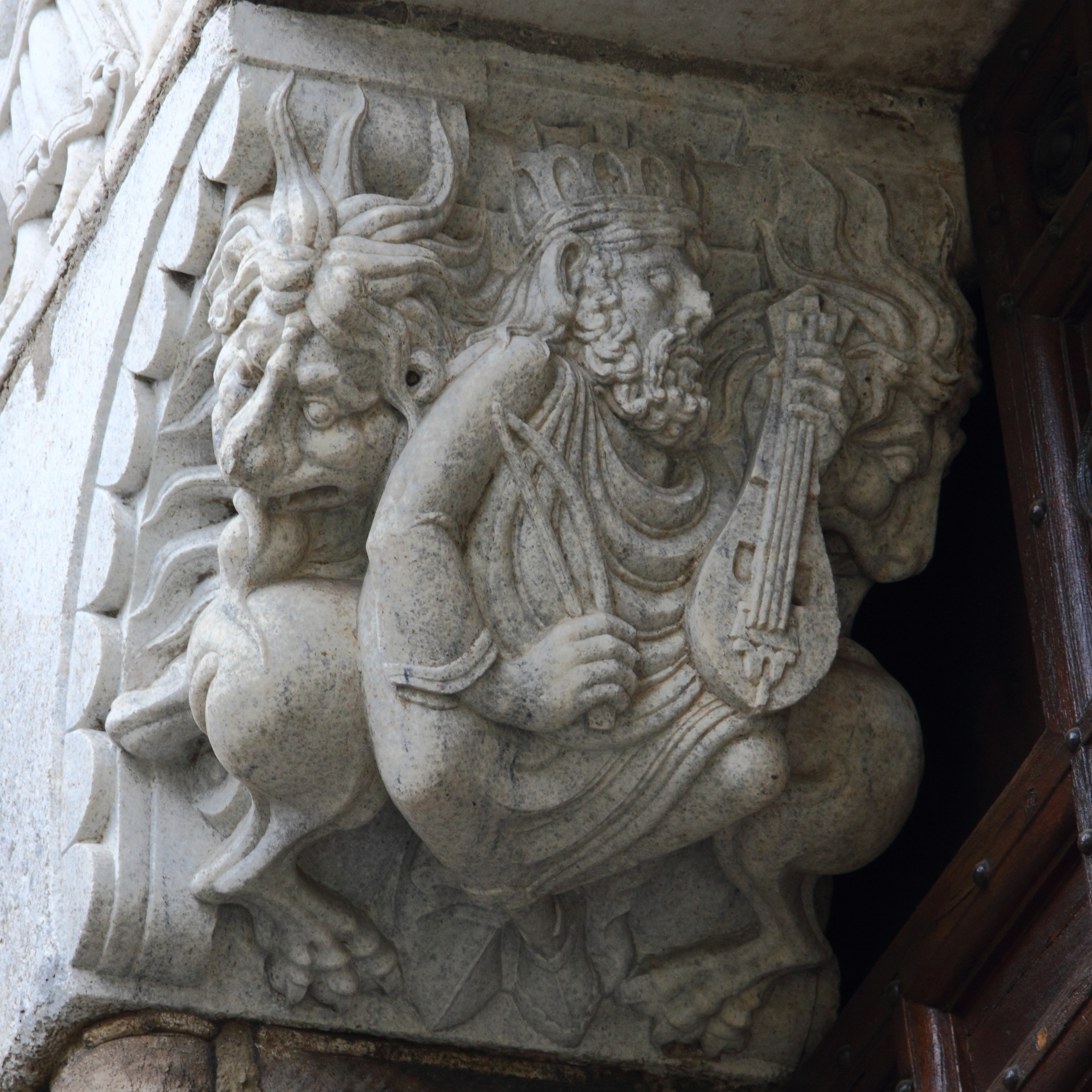
King David playing the rebec

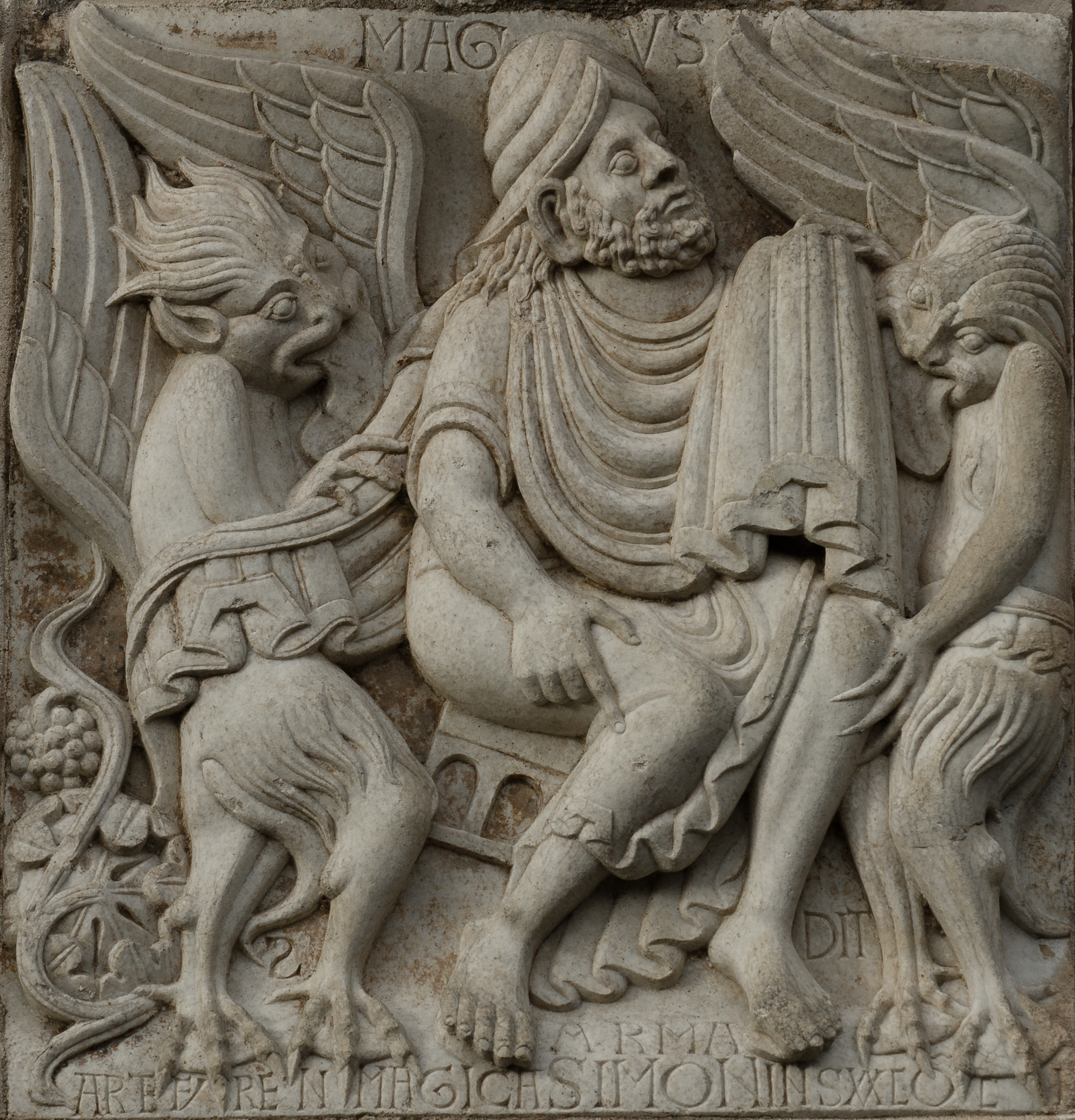
Simon the magician, the demons and the birth of the vine

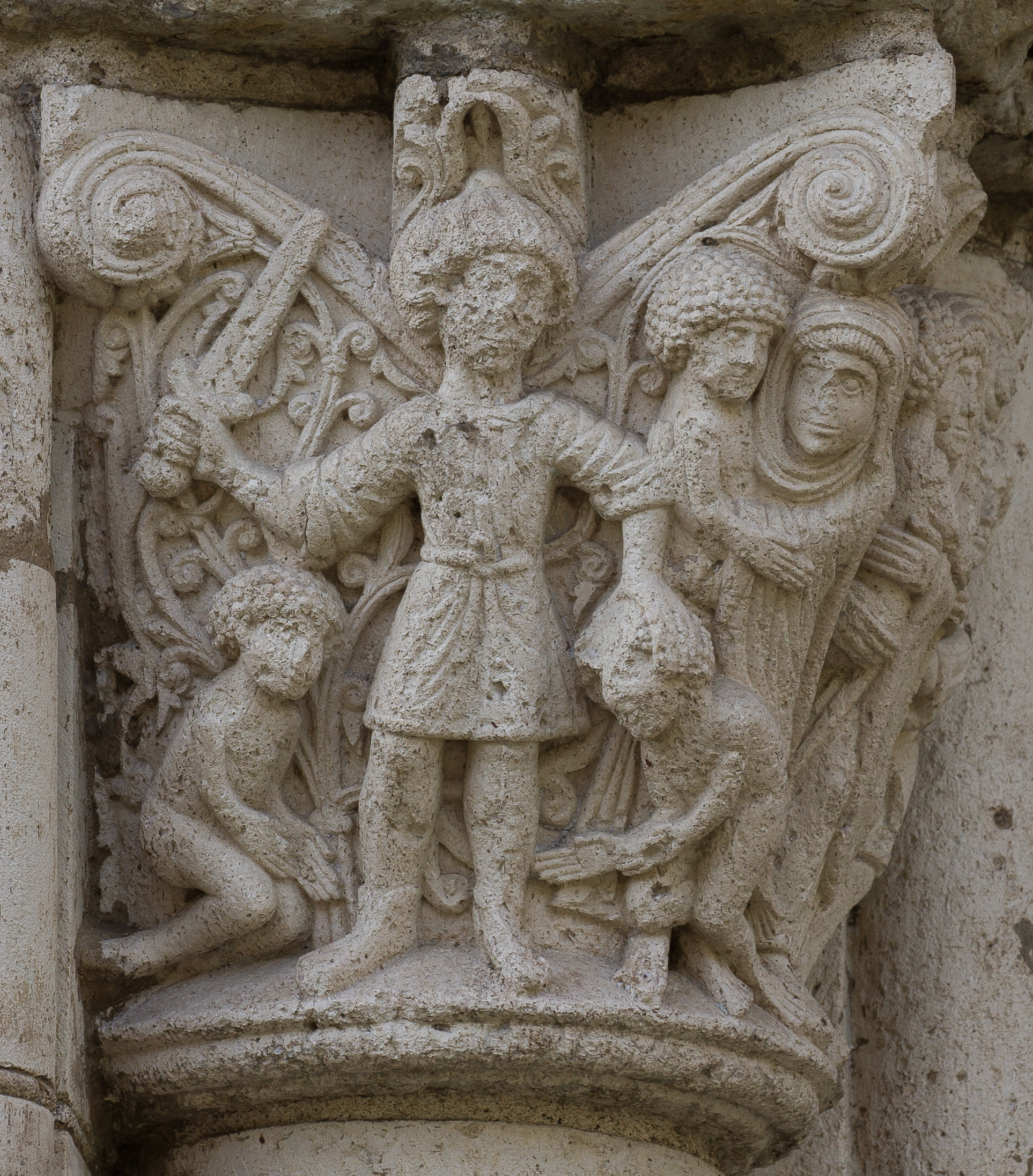
The Massacre of the Holy Innocents

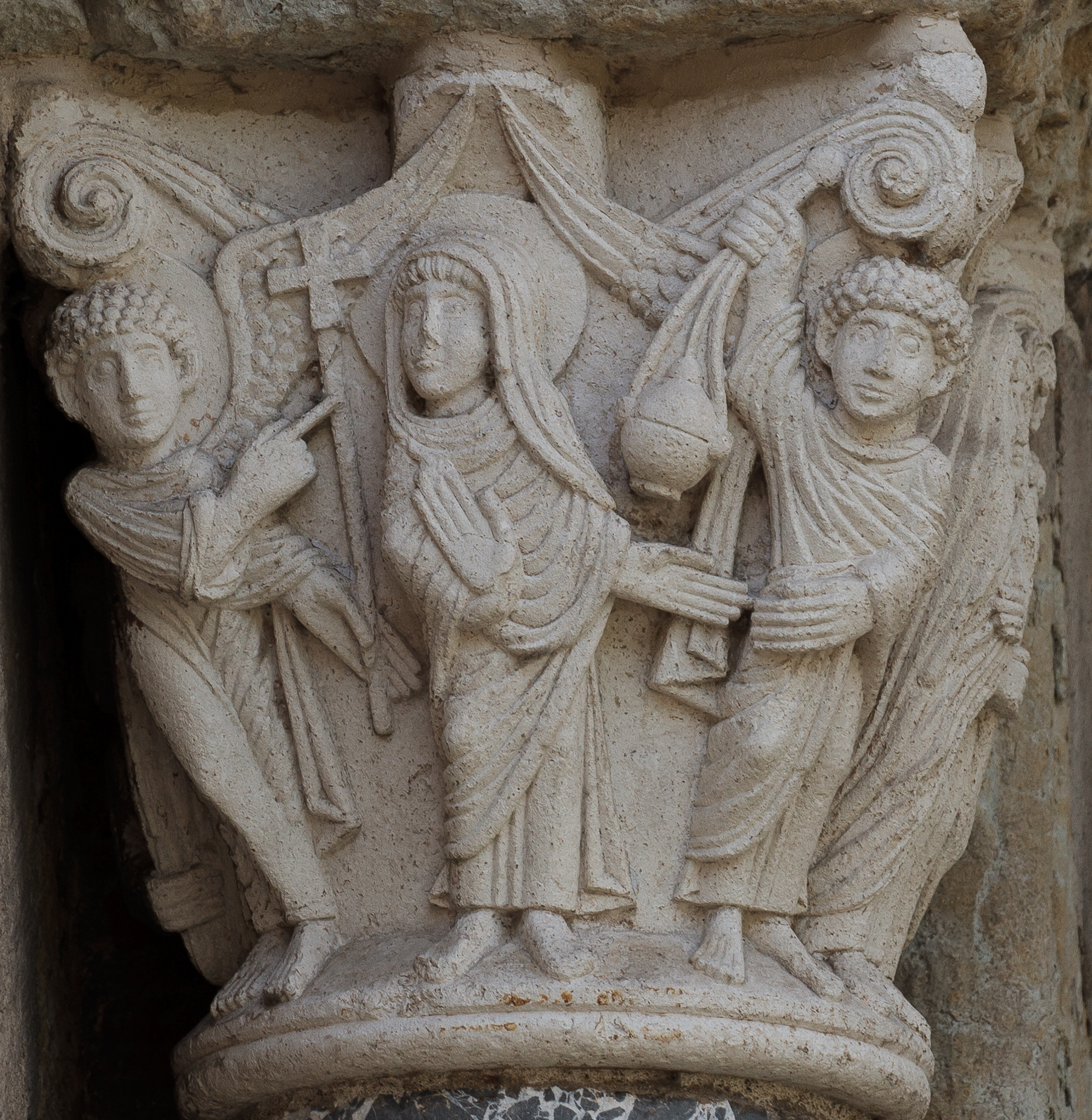
The Annunciation and Visitation of the Virgin Mary

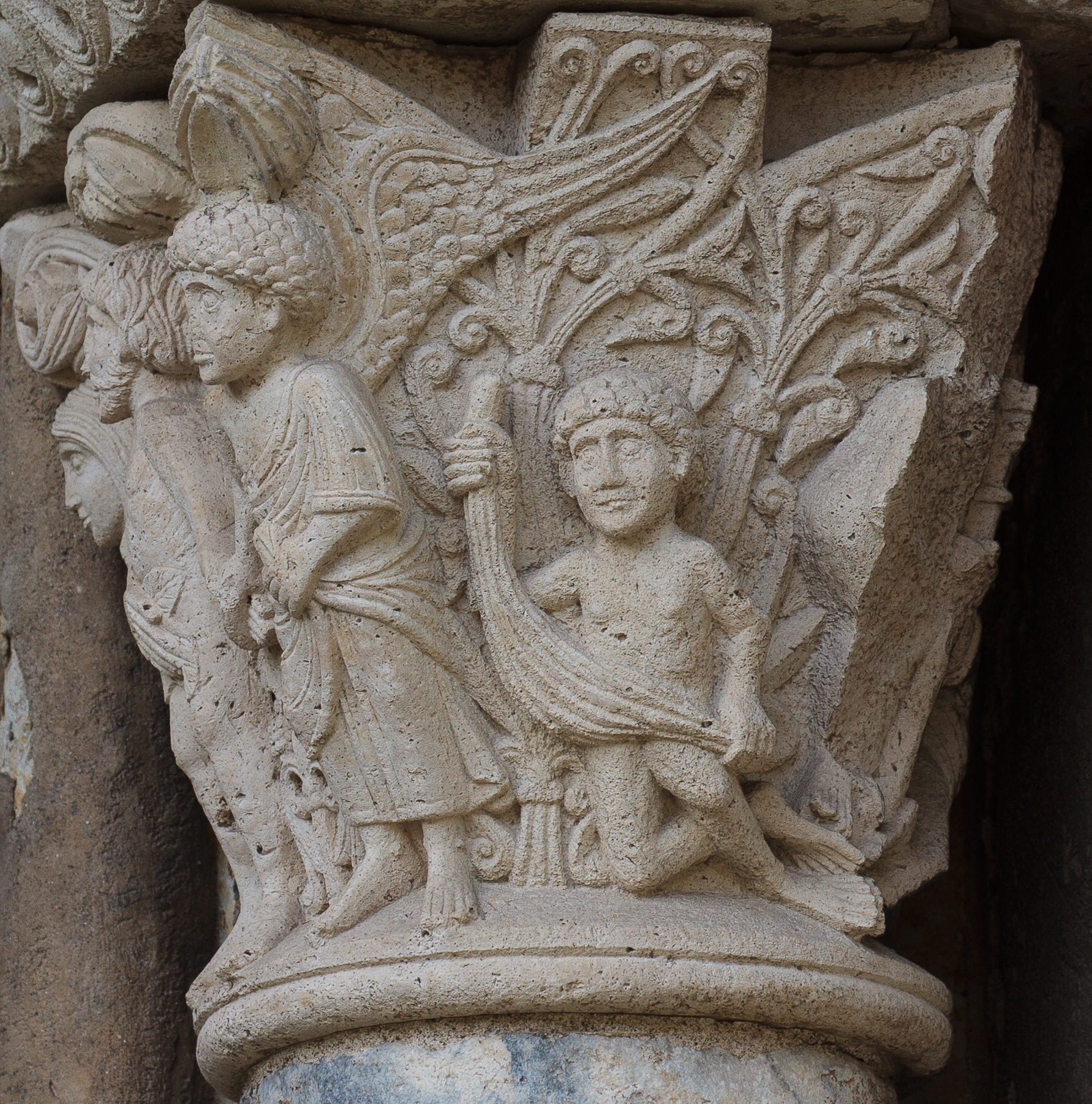
Adam and Eve being chased out of the Garden of Eden

=== Interior ===
The interior of the basilica measures 115 x 64 x 21 meters, making it vast for a Romanesque church. The central nave is barrel vaulted; the four aisles have rib vaults and are supported by buttresses. Directly under the tower and the transept is a marble altar, consecrated by Pope Urban II in 1096 and designed by Bernard Gelduin.

As well as Saint Saturnin, Saint Honoratus is also buried here. The crypt contains the relics of many other saints, including, by tradition, the Apostles St Simon and St Jude.

The basilica also contains a large three-manual Cavaillé-Coll organ built in 1888. Together with the Cavaillé-Coll instruments at Saint-Sulpice and the Church of St. Ouen, Rouen, it is considered to be one of the most important organs in France. It was inaugurated on 3 April 1889 by Alexandre Guilmant. From 1992 to 1996, it was restored by organ builders Jean-Loup Boisseau, Bertrand Cattiaux and Patrice Bellet. The current Titular organist is Michel Bouvard.

== Gallery ==
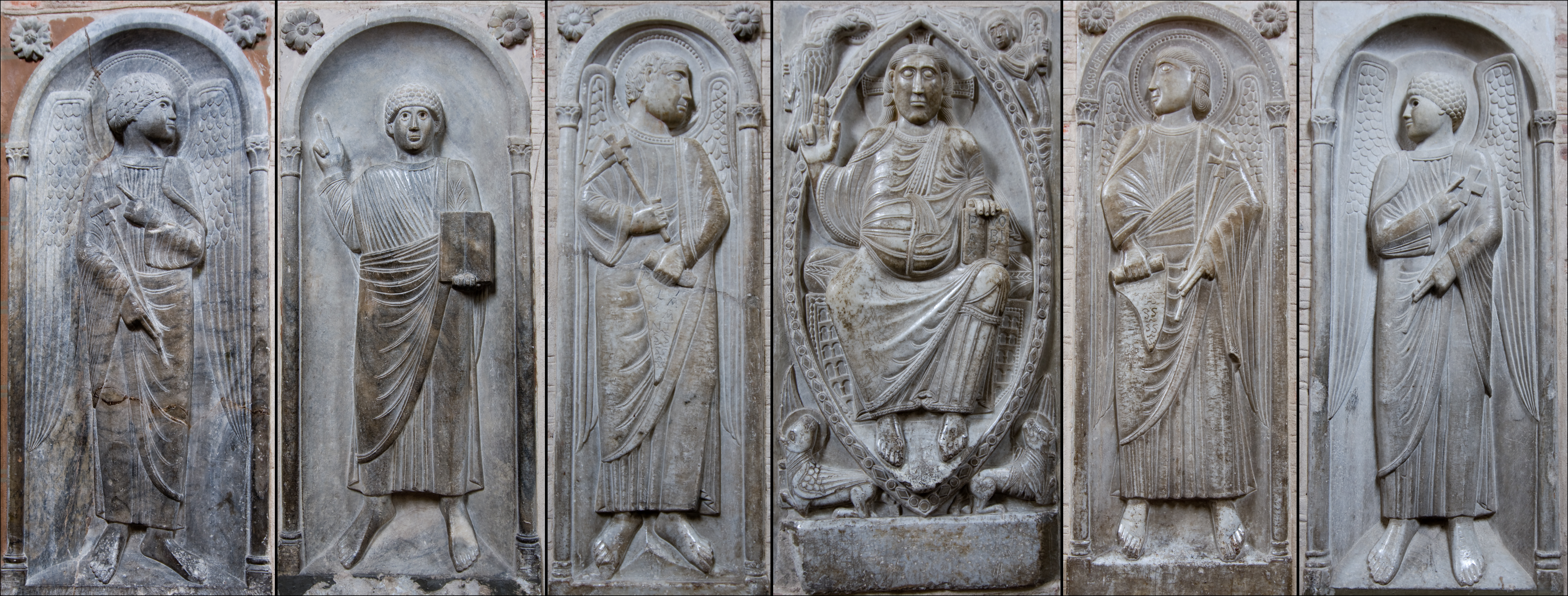
Marble bas-reliefs

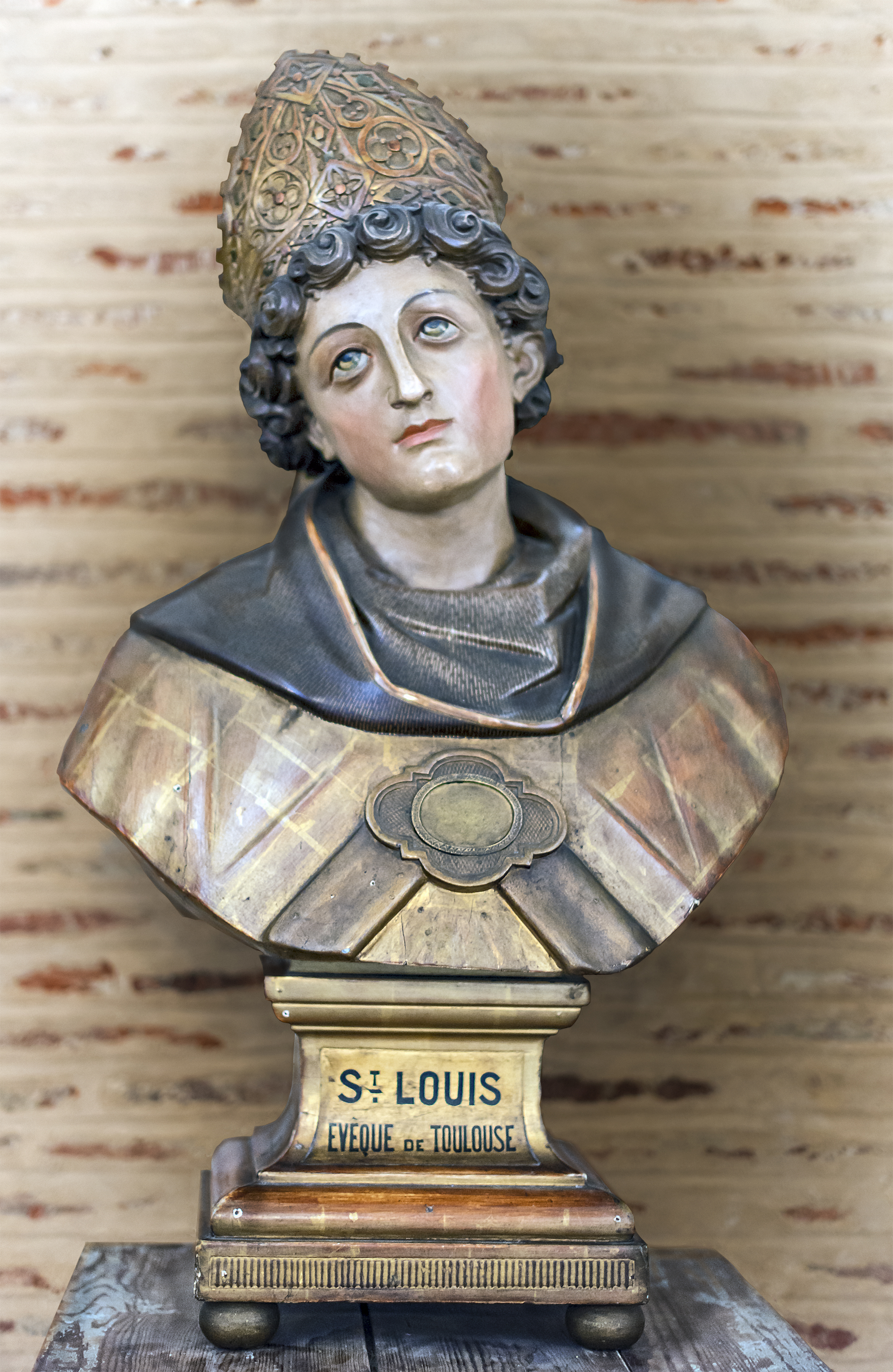
Bust of Louis of Toulouse

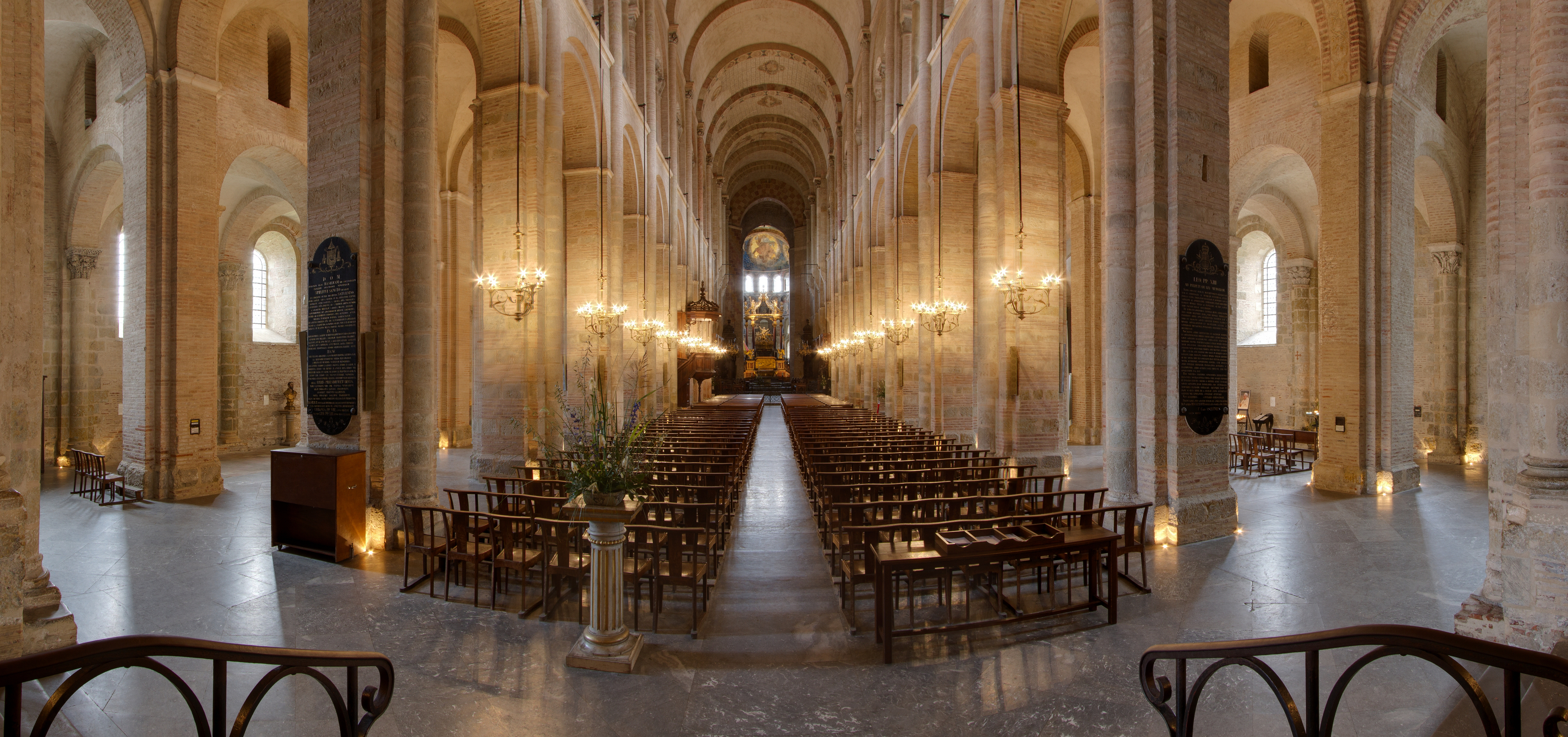
Nave

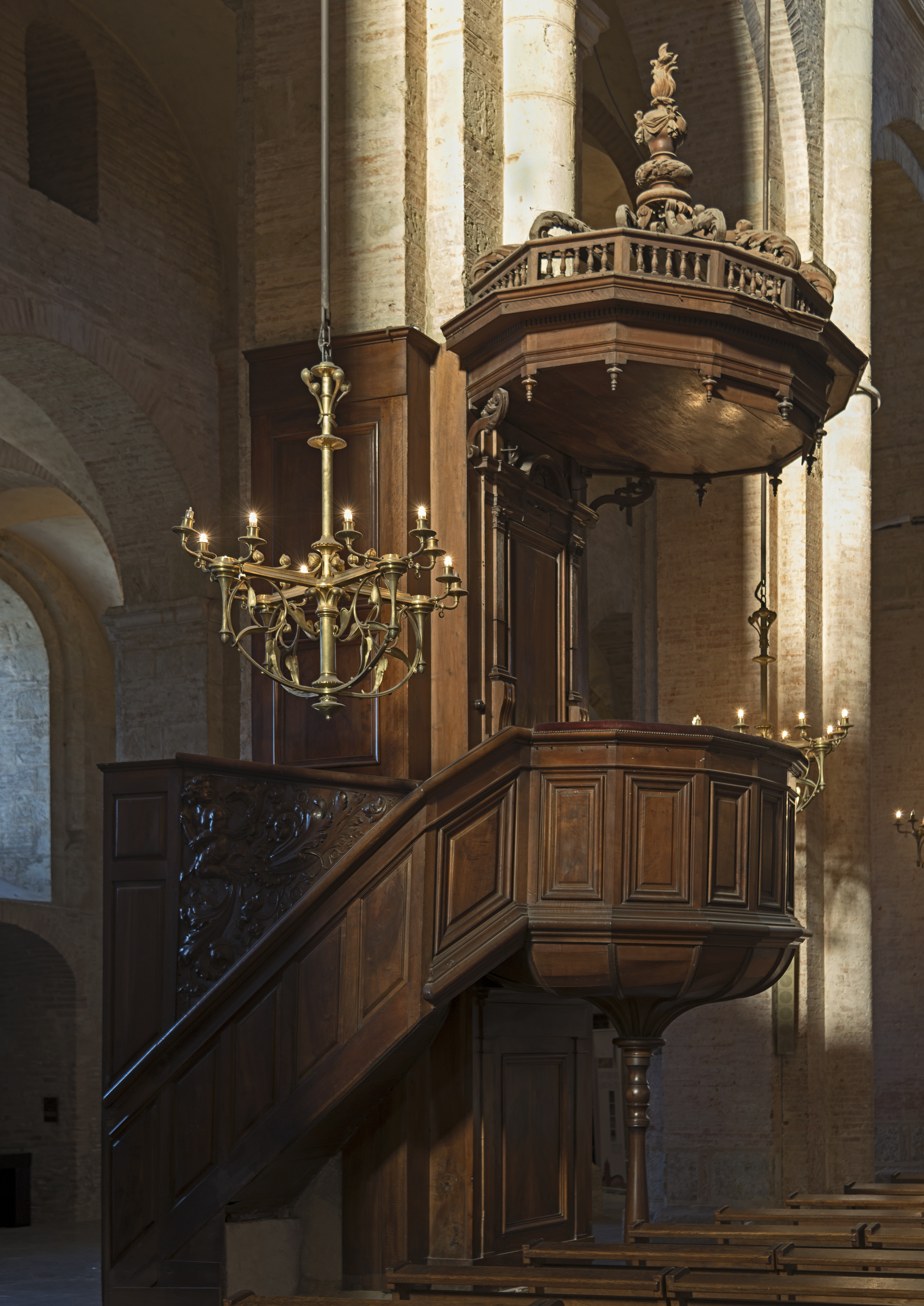
Pulpit

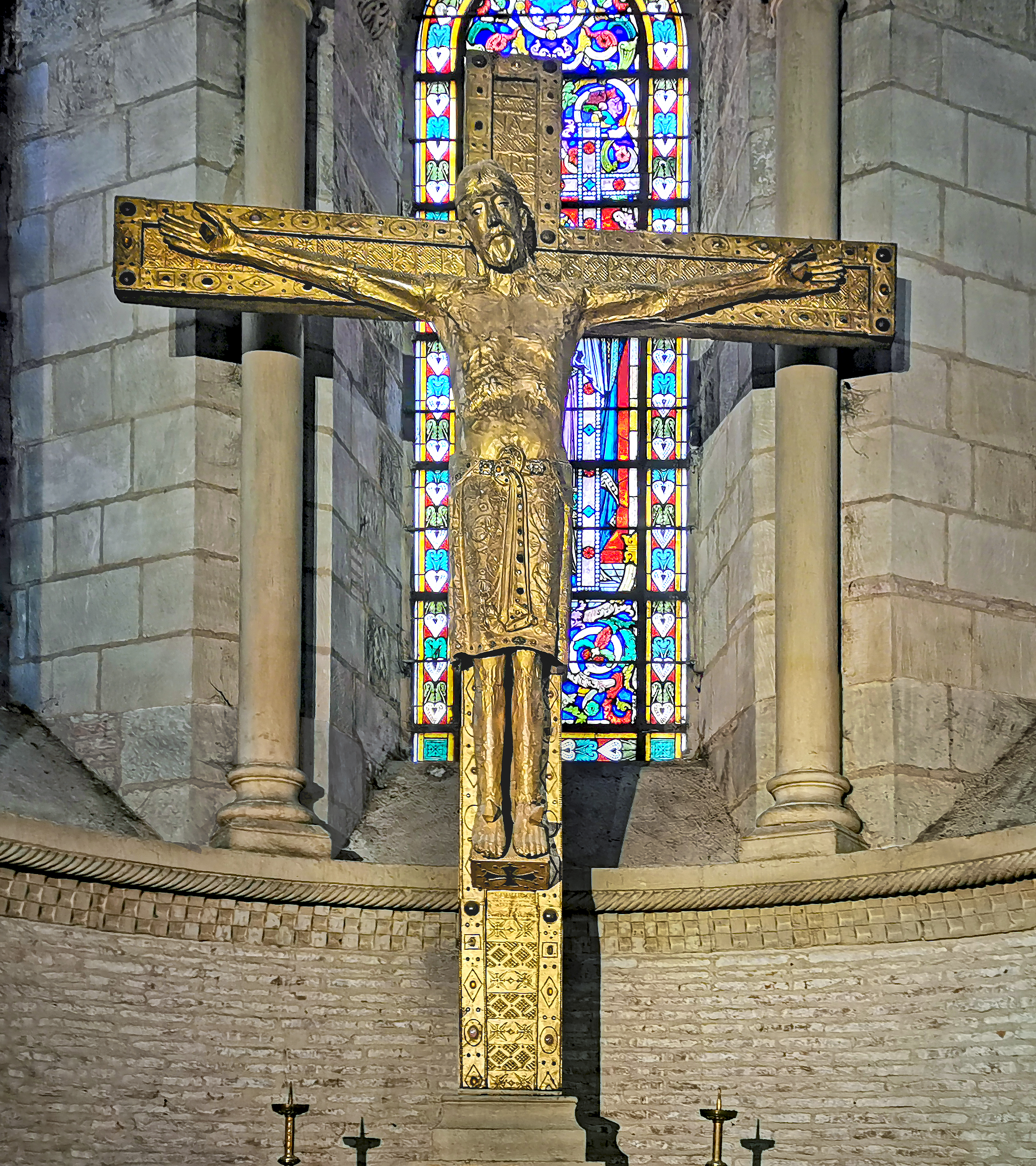
Chapel of the Crucifix

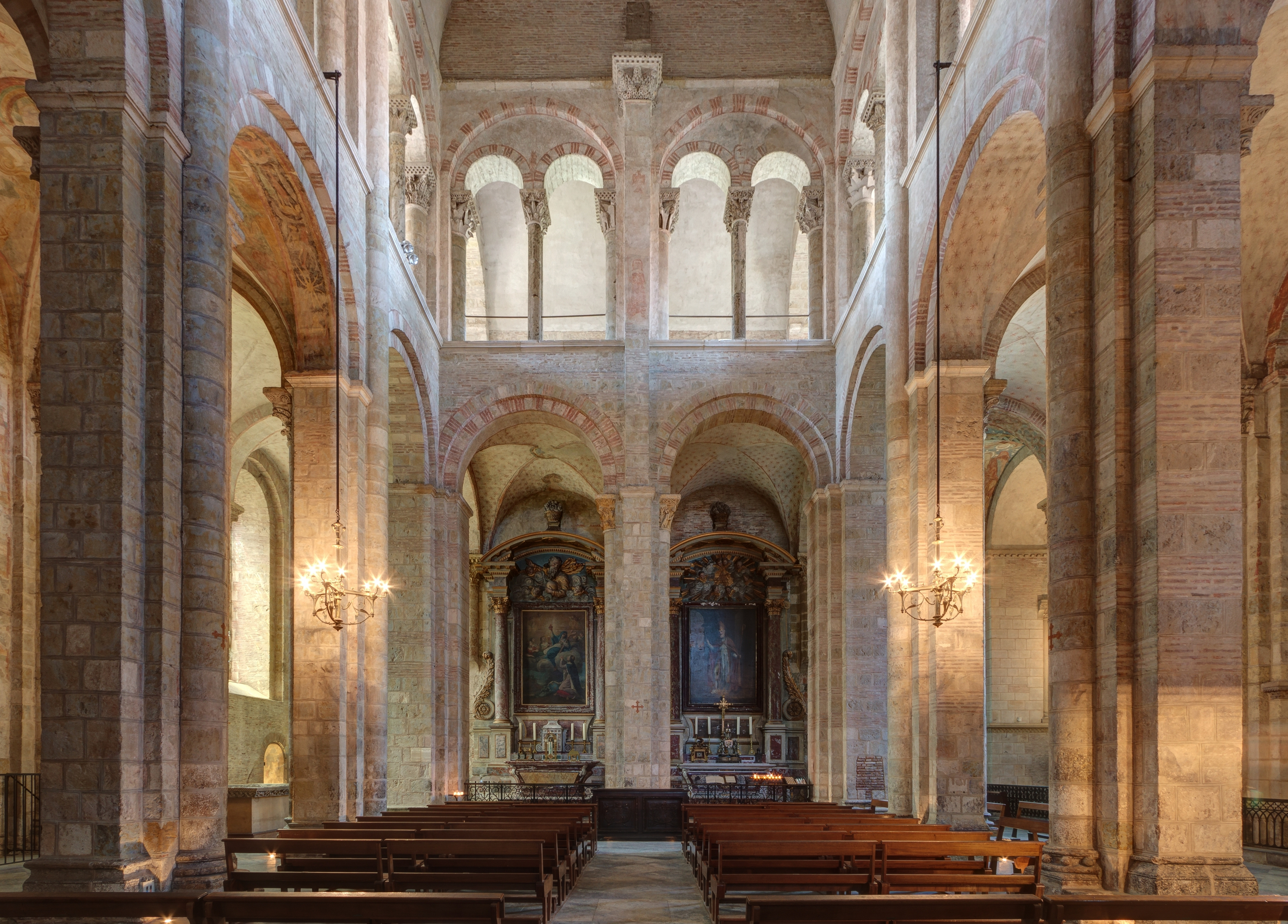
Brace north transept

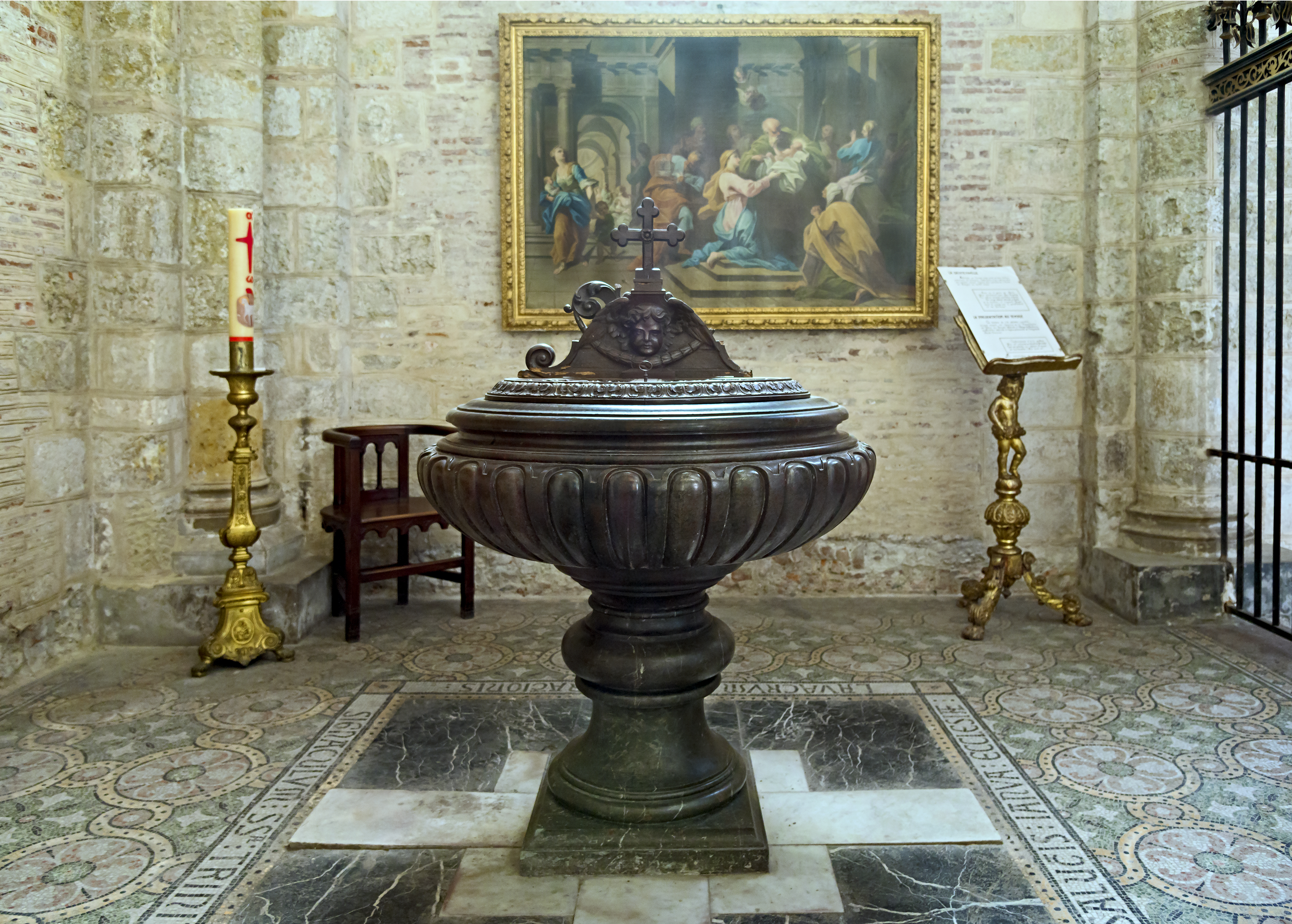
Fonts

Plan

== See also ==
- French Romanesque architecture

== Sources ==
- O'Reilly, E. B., 1921: How France Built her Cathedrals. London and New York: Harper and Brothers
