= Émile Marcus =

French Roman Catholic archbishop (born 1930)

The Most Reverend Émile Marcus P.S.S.
- Archbishop Emeritus of Toulouse
- Church: Roman Catholic Church
- Archdiocese: Toulouse
- Appointed: 3 December 1996
- Term ended: 11 July 2006
- Predecessor: André Collini
- Successor: Robert Le Gall
- Previous posts: Auxiliary Bishop of Paris (1977–1982), Bishop of Nantes (1982–1996)

Orders
- Ordination: 29 June 1957
- Consecration: 13 May 1977 by François Marty

Personal details
- Born: 29 June 1930 (age 95) Neuilly-Plaisance, France
- Denomination: Roman Catholic
- Motto: Prior dilexit nos
- Coat of arms

Émile Marcus P.S.S. (born 29 June 1930) is a French Roman Catholic prelate, who served as Archbishop of Toulouse from 1996 until his retirement in 2006. He previously served as Auxiliary Bishop of Paris and as Bishop of Nantes.

== Early life and education ==
Marcus was born on 29 June 1930 in Neuilly-Plaisance, France. He studied at Saint-Sulpice Seminary in Issy-les-Moulineaux and later completed theological studies at the Pontifical University of Saint Thomas Aquinas in Rome, earning a doctorate in theology.

He was ordained a priest for the Archdiocese of Paris on 29 June 1957. In 1958 he joined the Society of Priests of Saint Sulpice.

== Episcopal ministry ==
On 16 February 1977, Pope Paul VI appointed Marcus Auxiliary Bishop of Archdiocese of Paris and Titular Bishop of Tres Tabernae. His appointment was reported in Le Monde shortly thereafter. He was consecrated bishop on 13 May 1977 by Cardinal Gabriel Auguste François Marty.

Marcus was appointed Bishop of Nantes on 15 April 1982.

On 7 May 1996 he was named Coadjutor Archbishop of Toulouse and succeeded as Archbishop on 3 December 1996. He served until 11 July 2006, when his resignation was accepted by Pope Benedict XVI.

During his episcopate he was active within the Bishops' Conference of France.

== Later life ==
Following his retirement, Marcus has continued to participate in ecclesial and pastoral activities. In 2014 he presided at the dedication of a new altar in Bréhand, as reported by Le Télégramme.
