= Zephirium =

Titular Bishopric of the Roman Catholic Church

Zephirium is a titular Bishopric of the Roman Catholic Church located in Cilicia.

There are five known bishops of the Seat.

- Hypatus, attended the Council of Chalcedon.
- Zenobus, an associate of Theodoret of Cyrrhus
- Jean-Jacques Crouzet (1 Oct 1888 Appointed - 8 Jan 1933).
- Antonin Eltschkner (10 Feb 1933 Appointed - 22 Feb 1961)
- André Collini (7 Sep 1962 Appointed - 26 Jul 1966)
