= Gabriel de Gramont =

French Roman Catholic bishop and cardinal

- Archbishop of Toulouse
- Church: Catholic Church
- Archdiocese: Archdiocese of Toulouse
- In office: 17 October 1533 – 26 March 1534
- Predecessor: Jean d'Orléans-Longueville
- Successor: Odet de Coligny
- Other posts: Bishop of Poitiers (1532-1534); Cardinal-Priest of Santa Cecilia (1531-1534); Bishop of Tarbes (1524-1534)
- Previous posts: Cardinal-Priest of San Giovanni a Porta Latina (1530-1531); Archbishop of Bordeaux (1529-1530); Bishop of Couserans (1523-1524)

Orders
- Created cardinal: 8 June 1530 by Pope Clement VII

Personal details
- Born: 1486 Gascony, Kingdom of France
- Died: 26 March 1534 (aged 47–48) Balma, Languedoc, Kingdom of France

Gabriel de Gramont (1486 – 26 March 1534) was a French Roman Catholic bishop and cardinal.

== Biography ==
Gabriel de Gramont was born in Gascony in 1486, the son of Roger de Gramont, signeur of Bidache, and Eléonore de Béarn. His brother, Charles de Gramont was the Archbishop of Bordeaux.

Early in his life, he was ordained as a deacon. On 25 June 1515 he was elected Bishop of Couserans. He was transferred to the see of Tarbes on 19 September 1524. He occupied that see until his death.

He was maître des suppliques under Francis I of France. He was promoted to the metropolitan see of Bordeaux. In 1525, the queen regent, Louise of Savoy sent Bishop Gramont to Spain to secure the freedom of Francis I. In 1526, he was imprisoned by Charles V, Holy Roman Emperor, who was angry at his role in founding the League of Cognac; when England and France arrested the imperial ambassadors, the emperor ordered Bishop Gramont released. Returning to the Kingdom of France, he was despatched to the Kingdom of England in an attempt to encourage Henry VIII of England to divorce Catherine of Aragon and form a French alliance by marrying Marguerite de Navarre, the sister of King Francis and the widow of Charles IV, Duke of Alençon. He was then sent as French ambassador to the Holy See.

On 14 July 1529 he was elected Archbishop of Bordeaux by the cathedral chapter of Bordeaux Cathedral; Pope Clement VII confirmed his appointment on 24 September 1529. He resigned the administration of the archdiocese to his brother Charles de Gramont on 9 March 1530. In December 1529, the pope made him his nuncio extraordinary to the Kingdom of France.

Pope Clement VII made him a cardinal priest in the consistory of 8 June 1530. He received the red hat and the titular church of San Giovanni a Porta Latina on 22 June 1530. He opted for the titular church of Santa Cecilia in Trastevere on 9 January 1531.

On 13 January 1532 Francis I of France named him Bishop of Poitiers. He subsequently occupied that see until his death.

In 1533 he negotiated the marriage between Henry, Duke of Orléans and Catherine de' Medici, the niece of Pope Clement VII. As part of these negotiations, on 1 August 1533, the pope met the king of France at Marseille.

On 17 October 1533 he was named Archbishop of Toulouse. He subsequently occupied that see until his death.

He died of typhoid fever in the château of Balma on 26 March 1534. He was buried with his ancestors in the church of Bidache.
