= Jean d'Orléans-Longueville =

- Archbishop of Toulouse
- Church: Catholic Church
- Archdiocese: Archdiocese of Toulouse
- In office: 25 November 1503 – 24 September 1533
- Predecessor: Hector de Bourbon
- Successor: Gabriel de Gramont
- Other posts: Cardinal-Priest of Santi Silvestro e Martino ai Monti (1533); Bishop of Orléans (1521-1533)

Orders
- Consecration: 26 April 1517 by Philippe de Luxembourg
- Created cardinal: 3 March 1533 by Pope Clement VII

Personal details
- Born: 1484 Parthenay, Poitou, Kingdom of France
- Died: 24 September 1533 (aged 48–49) Tarascon, Province of Provence, Kingdom of France

Jean d'Orléans-Longueville (1484, in Château de Parthenay – 24 September 1533, in Tarascon), Cardinal de Longueville was a cardinal of the Roman Catholic Church for six months in 1533. He was abbot in commendam of Bec, and concurrently archbishop of Toulouse (1503) and bishop of Orléans (1521).

== Biography ==
Jean d’Orléans-Longueville was born in Parthenay in 1484, the third son of François d'Orléans, Count of Dunois and Agnes of Savoy. His older brothers were François II, Duke of Longueville and Louis I d'Orléans, Duke of Longueville. He was a relative of Louis XI of France and Louis XII of France, the latter of whom provided for his education.

He began his ecclesiastical career as a cleric at Chartres Cathedral. On 29 November 1503 he was elected Archbishop of Toulouse. He was the administrator of the archdiocese until he reached the canonical age of 27. He received the pallium on 14 August 1517 and then occupied the see until his death. On 26 June 1521 he was named Bishop of Orléans. He also occupied that see until his death.

Pope Clement VII made him a cardinal priest in the consistory of 3 March 1533. He received the red hat and the titular church of San Martino ai Monti at that time.

In 1533, he was traveling to Marseille to witness Pope Clement VII perform the marriage of Henry, Duke of Orléans and Catherine de' Medici. He died on the way to Marseille, at Tarascon on 24 September 1533.
