= Guy de Kerimel =

French prelate

Guy André Marie de Kerimel de Kerveno
- Archbishop of Toulouse
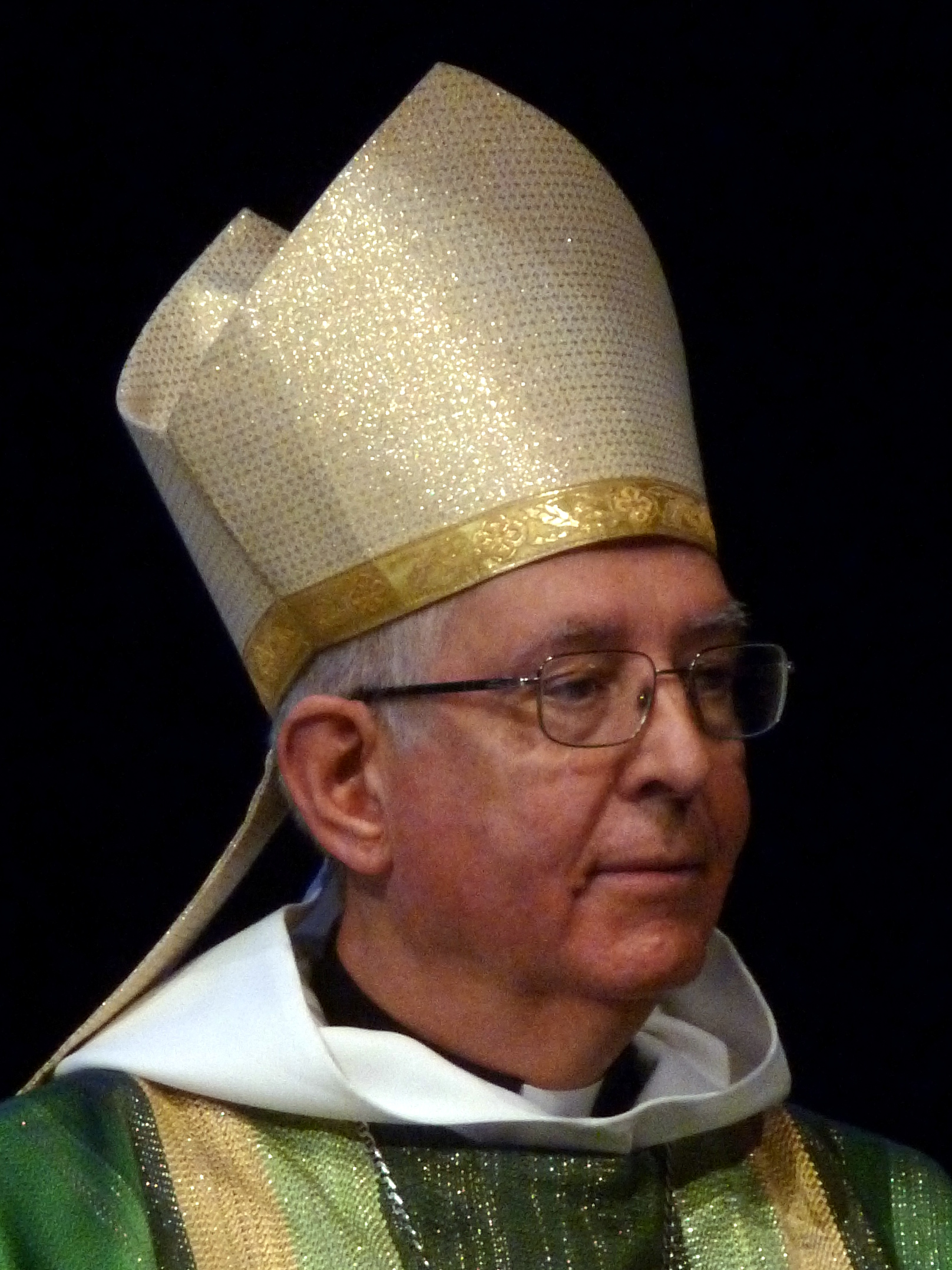
- de Kerimel in 2015
- Church: Catholic Church
- Archdiocese: Archdiocese of Toulouse
- Appointed: 9 December 2021
- Predecessor: Robert Le Gall
- Previous posts: Bishop of Grenoble-Vienne (2006-2021); Bishop of Grenoble (2006); Coadjutor Bishop of Grenoble (2004-2006); Titular Bishop of Casae Medianae]] (2001-2004); Auxiliary Bishop of Nice (2001-2004)

Orders
- Ordination: 29 June 1986 by Bernard Panafieu
- Consecration: 17 June 2001 by Jean Bonfils

Personal details
- Born: 7 August 1953 (age 72) Meknes, French Morocco, French Empire
- Coat of arms

Guy André Marie de Kerimel de Kerveno (born 7 August 1953) is a French prelate of the Catholic Church who has been archbishop of Toulouse since January 2022. He was bishop of Grenoble from 2006 to 2021, after serving two years as coadjutor there, and before that for three years as an auxiliary bishop in Nice.

== Biography ==
=== Early life ===
Guy de Kerimel was born in Meknes, Morocco, on 6 August 1953, the fifth of eight children born to Jacques de Kerimel, a farmer and agricultural adviser, and Annick (Prouvot) Kerimel. After preparatory school at Sérigné in the Vendée, he then obtained the baccalaureate at the Institute Saint Joseph de Fontenay-le-Comte and did additional studies at the École Nationale des Chartes. He then earned a licentiate at the Lycée Henri IV in Paris. He continued his studies at the Sorbonne, earning a master's degree in history in 1977.

In Paris he also encountered the Emmanuel Community, which he joined in 1978. In 1979, he worked as a civil employee with mentally handicapped children in a medical-educational institute in Sees in the department Orne. He spent the next two years working on the Emmanuel Community's team aiding adults in difficulty.

Beginning in 1981, he studied at the French seminary in Rome, obtaining a licentiate in moral theology at the Gregorian University. He was ordained a priest for the diocese of Aix and Arles on 29 June 1986.

=== Career ===
After ordination he was vicar of the parish of Saint Francis of Assisi in Aix-en-Provence (1988–89) and on the staff of the diocesan seminary of Saint-Luc (1987–96), and responsible for the qualifying year at that seminary (1988–96), pastor and then dean for the Gardanne zone from 1996 to 2000 and a member of the Episcopal Council of the diocese from 1997 to 2001. He also served the Emmanuel Community as a member of the Community Council from 1991 to 1994 and as a guide for seminarians from 1991 to 1996.

He was appointed auxiliary bishop of Nice on 19 February 2001 He was the second member of the Emmanuel Community to be named a bishop. He was consecrated on June 17. On 6 May 2004, he was appointed bishop coadjutor of Grenoble. He succeeded as bishop there on June 10, 2006.

Within the Bishops' Conference of France, having been a member of the Episcopal Commission of the consecrated life, he is now a member of the Commission for ordained ministers and laity in ecclesial mission. In November 2012, he was elected head of a working group on "social phenomenon of abortion and the education of youth." He heads the commission on liturgy and sacramental care. In that post he has supported restrictions on the use of Latin liturgies by those who use the liturgy to oppose the teachings of the Second Vatican Council.

Pope Francis appointed him archbishop of Toulouse on 9 December 2021. His installation followed on 30 January 2022.
