= Robert Le Gall =

French bishop (born 1946)

The Most Reverend Robert Le Gall O.S.B.
- Archbishop emeritus of Toulouse
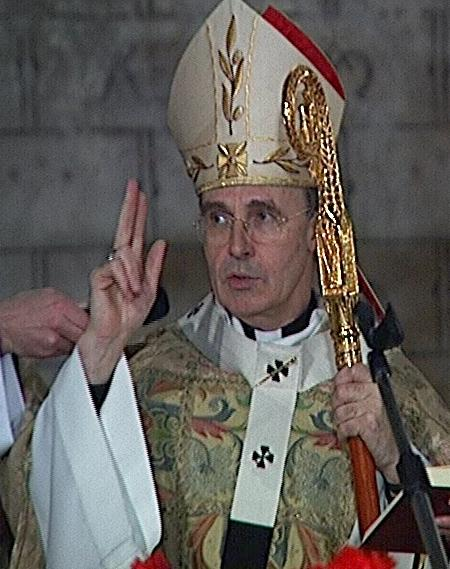
- Le Gall in 2008.
- Church: Roman Catholic Church
- Archdiocese: Toulouse
- See: Toulouse
- Appointed: 11 July 2006
- Installed: 10 September 2006
- Term ended: 9 December 2021
- Predecessor: Émile Marcus
- Successor: Guy de Kerimel
- Previous post(s): Bishop of Mende (2001–06)

Orders
- Ordination: 24 August 1974 by Pierre-Auguste-Marie Boussard
- Consecration: 6 January 2002 by Paul Joseph Jean Poupard

Personal details
- Born: Robert Jean Louis Le Gall; 26 February 1946 (age 79); Saint-Hilaire-du-Harcouët, France
- Motto: De unitate Trinitatis
- Coat of arms

Robert Jean Louis Le Gall O.S.B. (born 26 February 1946) is a French prelate of the Catholic Church who was Archbishop of Toulouse from 2006 to 2021. He was previously the Bishop of Mende from 2001 to 2006.

== Biography ==
Robert Jean Louis Le Gall was born in Saint-Hilaire-du-Harcouët, France, on 26 February 1946. At the age of eighteen he entered the Benedictine monastery of Sainte-Anne de Kergonam as a postulant and on 8 December 1965 took temporary vows. After performing his military service in Le Mans, he returned to the monastery and made his solemn profession as a Benedictine on 8 December 1970. After completing his philosophy studies there, he studied theology at the Abbey of Solesmes from 1971 to 1974. He was ordained a priest in the abbey of Kergonam on 24 August 1974. He earned a licenciate in theology in Freiburg, Switzerland, and then became Prior at Kergonam with responsibility for the guesthouse. He was elected Abbot on 27 May 1983 and took office on 16 July.

On 16 October 2001, Pope John Paul II appointed him Bishop of Mende. He received his episcopal consecration on 6 January 2002 from Cardinal Paul Poupard.

In the French Bishops Conference he has been President of the Episcopal Commission for Liturgy and Sacramental Pastoral Care. He was appointed to a five-year term as a member of the Congregation for Divine Worship and the Discipline of the Sacraments on 2 February 2005.

After Pope Benedict authorized the wider use of the extraordinary form of the Mass in 2007, Le Gall, as president of the French Bishops' Liturgy Commission, said advocates for its use exaggerated their numbers and he deplored unauthorized private celebrations of the extraordinary form. By way of contrast, he said those who celebrate the ordinary form needed to reform it by "reintroducing more silence, hierarchy, interiority, and the beauty of liturgical garments".

He was made a knight of the Legion of Honor on 13 July 2004.

On 11 July 2006, Pope Benedict XVI appointed him Archbishop of Toulouse.

He has written numerous articles on liturgy for Famille Chrétienne and other periodicals. His writings include a dictionary of liturgy (Dictionnaire de liturgie) that was published in 1983.

Pope Francis accepted his resignation on 9 December 2021.
