= Hector of Bourbon =

Hector of Bourbon may refer to:

- Hector, bastard of Bourbon (died 1414), illegitimate son of Duke Louis II of Bourbon
- Hector of Bourbon (bishop) (died 1502), bishop of Lavaur and archbishop of Toulouse, illegitimate son of Duke John II of Bourbon
- Hector de Bourbon (died 1525), viscount of Lavedan, eldest son of Charles de Bourbon-Lavedan
