= Louis-Jean Guyot =

French cardinal and archbishop

His Eminence Louis-Jean Guyot
- Cardinal, Archbishop of Toulouse
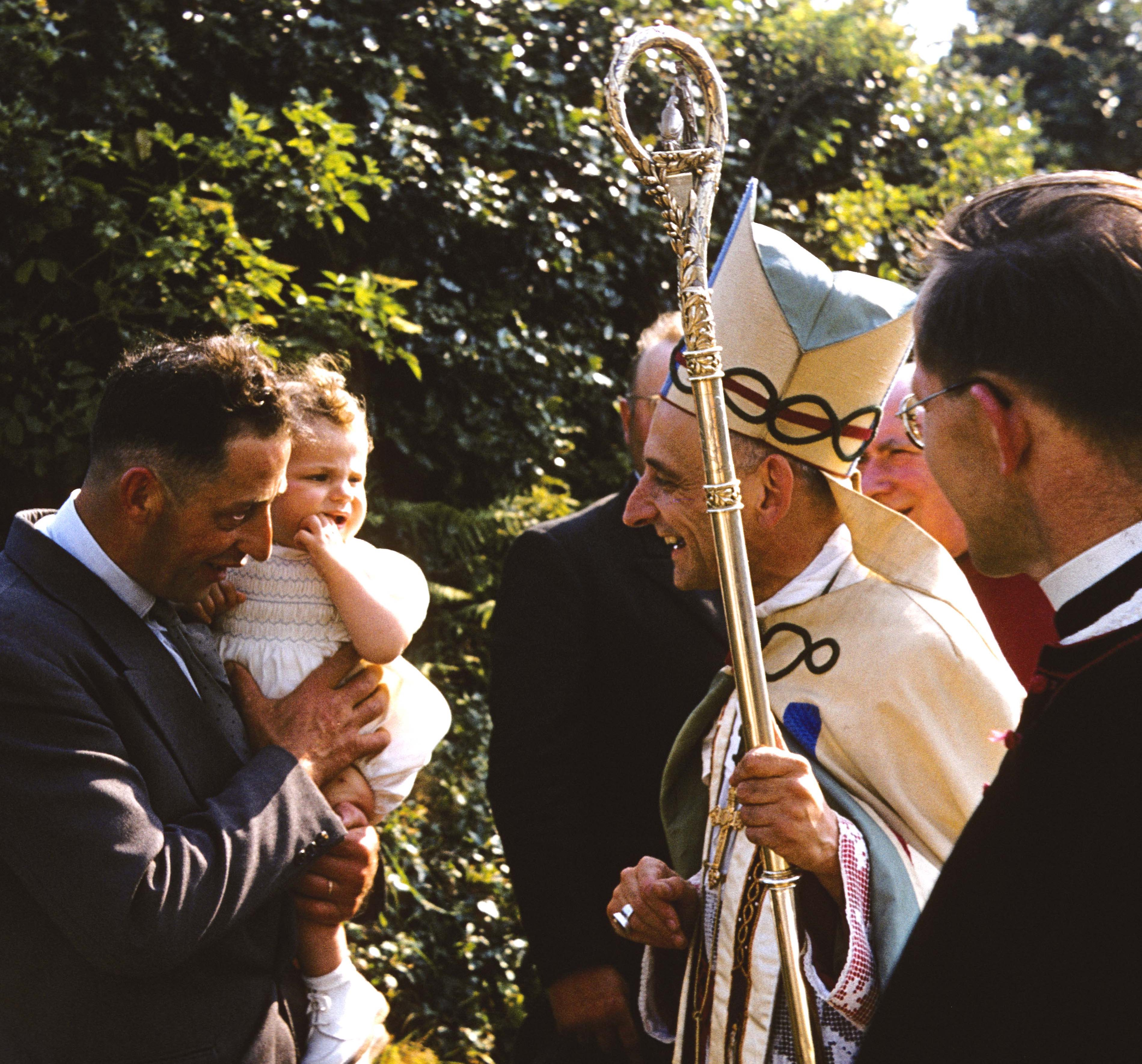
- Jean-Louis Guyot as Bishop of Coutances
- Church: Roman Catholic
- Archdiocese: Toulouse
- Installed: 1966
- Term ended: 16 November 1978
- Predecessor: Jules-Géraud Saliège
- Successor: André Charles Collini
- Other post: Cardinal-Priest of Sant’Agnese fuori le mura
- Previous post: Bishop of Coutances (1950–1966)

Orders
- Ordination: 29 June 1932
- Consecration: 4 May 1949
- Created cardinal: 5 Mar 1973 by Paul VI
- Rank: Cardinal-Priest

Personal details
- Born: 7 July 1905 Bordeaux France
- Died: 1 August 1988 (aged 83) Bordeaux France
- Buried: Toulouse Cathedral
- Coat of arms

Louis-Jean Guyot (7 July 1905 in Bordeaux in France – 1 August 1988 in Bordeaux) was a cardinal of the Catholic Church, and archbishop of Toulouse in 1966–1978.

In 1935 Guyot obtained a Doctorate in Sacred Theology from the Pontifical University of St. Thomas Aquinas, Angelicum with a dissertation entitled L'incorporation au Christ par les sacrements d'après la doctrine de st. Thomas.

He was made cardinal in 1973 by Pope Paul VI, named the cardinal-priest of Sant'Agnese fuori le mura.

He took part in the August 1978 Conclave which elected Pope John Paul I, and in the October 1978 Conclave which elected Pope John Paul II.

Catholic Church titles
Preceded by Carlo Confalonieri	Cardinal Priest of Sant'Agnese fuori le mura 5 March 1973 – 1 August 1988	Succeeded by Camillo Ruini
