= Archdiocese of Toulouse =

Latin Catholic archdiocese in France

Coordinates: 43.60°N 1.45°E

Archdiocese of Toulouse (–Saint Bertrand de Comminges–Rieux)

Catholic
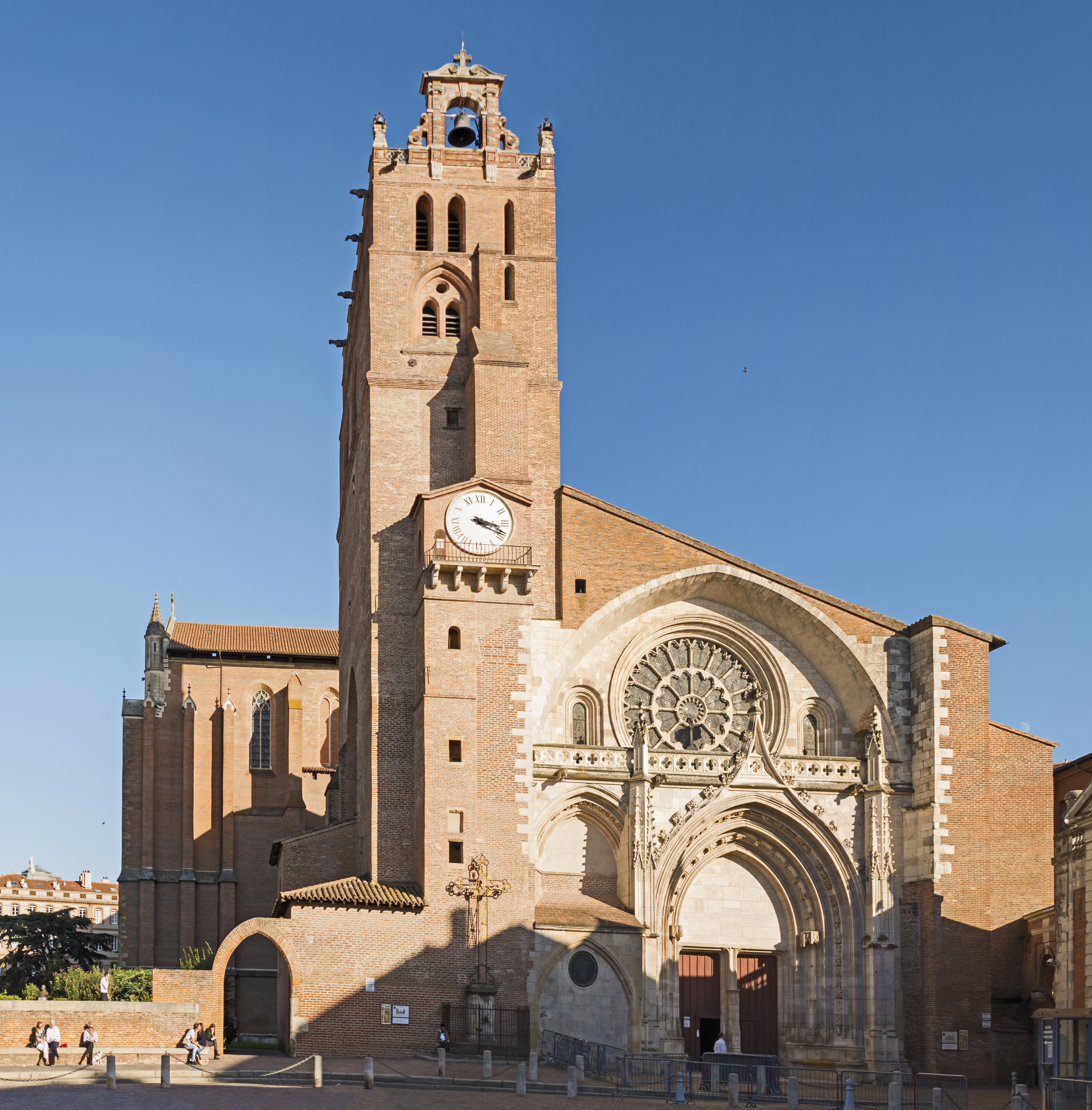
- Toulouse Cathedral

Location
- Country: France
- Ecclesiastical province: Toulouse

Statistics
- Area: 6,372 km^{2} (2,460 sq mi)
- Population: Total; Catholics: (as of 2022); 1,392,500; 843,390 (60.6%)
- Parishes: 602

Information
- Denomination: Catholic
- Sui iuris church: Latin Church
- Rite: Roman Rite
- Established: 3rd Century (as Diocese); 13 July 1317 (as Archdiocese)
- Cathedral: Cathedral of St. Stephen in Toulouse
- Patron saint: Saint Stephen
- Secular priests: 132 (Diocesan); 79 (Religious Orders); 45 Permanent Deacons

Current leadership
- Pope: Leo XIV
- Metropolitan Archbishop: Guy de Kerimel
- Suffragans: Albi; Auch; Cahors; Montauban; Pamiers; Rodez; Tarbes-et-Lourdes
- Auxiliary Bishops: Jean-Pierre Batut
- Bishops emeritus: Émile Marcus; Robert Le Gall

Map

Website
- Website of the Archdiocese

Ecclesiastical province of Toulouse

The Archdiocese of Toulouse (–Saint Bertrand de Comminges–Rieux) (Note: Latin: Archidioecesis Tolosana (–Convenarum–Rivensis); French: Archidiocèse de Toulouse (–Saint-Bertrand de Comminges–Rieux-Volvestre); Occitan: Archidiocèsi de Tolosa (–Sent Bertran de Comenge–Rius (Volvèstre))) is a Latin Church ecclesiastical territory of the Catholic Church in France. The diocese comprises the Department of Haute-Garonne and its seat is Toulouse Cathedral. Archbishop Guy de Kerimel has been its head since 2021.

In 2022, in the Archdiocese of Toulouse there was one priest for every 3,997 Catholics.

== Suffragans ==
The Archdiocese has 7 suffragan dioceses and archdioceses: Archdiocese of Albi, Archdiocese of Auch, Diocese of Cahors, Diocese of Montauban, Diocese of Pamiers, Diocese of Rodez, Diocese of Tarbes-et-Lourdes.

== Jurisdiction ==
As re-established by the Concordat of 1802, it included the departments of Haute-Garonne and Ariège, at which time, the archbishop joined to his own the title of Auch, jurisdiction over Auch being given to the Diocese of Agen, also the title of Narbonne, an archdiocese over which jurisdiction went by the Concordat to the Diocese of Carcassonne, and the title of Albi, over which, though formerly an archdiocese, jurisdiction went by the Concordat to the See of Montpellier. In consequence of the creation of the Archdiocese of Auch and Archdiocese of Albi under the Restoration, the Archbishop of Toulouse only styled himself Archbishop of Toulouse and Narbonne, and when the Diocese of Pamiers was created the limits of the Archdiocese were restricted to the Department of Haute-Garonne. As thus marked off by the Bull Paternae Caritatis, July, 1822, the Archdiocese of Toulouse includes almost the whole of the ancient Diocese of Toulouse, Diocese of Rieux, and Diocese of Comminges, and a few small portions of the ancient Diocese of Montauban, Diocese of Lavaur, Diocese of St-Papoul, Diocese of Mirepoix, and Diocese of Lombez.

== History ==
Toulouse, chief town of the Tectosagi, at the end of the second century B.C. tried to shake off the yoke of Rome during the invasion of the Cimbri, but at the beginning of the empire it was a prosperous Roman civitas with famous schools in which the three brothers of the Emperor Constantine were pupils. In the fourth century it was reckoned the fifteenth town in importance in the empire.

In 413 it was taken by Astulph, the Goth, and in 419 under Wallia it became the capital of the Visigothic Kingdom. In 508 after conquest by Clovis it became Frankish. Legends of more or less recent date claim that it was evangelized by St. Martial, but as far as historical evidence goes the see seems to have been founded by St. Saturninus (Sernin) in the middle of the third century. The Passio Sancti Saturnini corroborates this date as that of his incumbency and martyrdom. Subsequent tradition claims that he was a disciple of St. Peter. St. Papoul was his companion and like him a martyr.

According to Gregory of Tours history written in the 6th century, Saturninus was martyred by being dragged by a bull, and due to his having been abandoned by the local priests, he prayed to Christ that the diocese would forever be ruled by bishops that were not citizens of the city.

St. Honoratus, given in some lists as St. Saturninus's successor, is recognised as a pre-Schism Western saint by the Orthodox Church and it is therefore wrong to suggest that he seems just to have crept in through error from the fabulous legend of St. Firminus of Amiens.

Among the bishops of Toulouse may be mentioned: Rhodanius (350-58), exiled by Constantius to Phrygia because of his efforts against Arianism at the Council of Béziers in 356; St. Hilary, whom some historians place before Rhodanius, but who is placed after him by Duchesne; St. Sylvius (360-400); St. Exuperius (c. 400), who drove from his diocese in 405 the heretic Vigilantius, saved Toulouse from the Vandals, and was the friend of St. Jerome; St. Germerius (Germier), whose episcopate (c. 541) is questioned by Duchesne; Magnulphus (c. 585), exiled by King Gundoald; St. Erembert (657), a monk of Fontenelle who returned to his monastery to die.

From being the capital of the Duchy of Aquitaine, from 631, Toulouse became in 778 the capital of the County of Toulouse created by Charlemagne, and which in the tenth century was one of the main fiefs of the crown. Raymond IV, Count of Toulouse, known as Raymond de Saint Gilles (1042–1105), was one of the leaders of the First Crusade.

Raymond VI and Raymond VII, Counts of Toulouse, had leanings towards the Cathars. Simon de Montfort in 1218 died under the walls of Toulouse, At this time Toulouse had as bishop Fulk of Marseilles (1206–1231), who fought against Raymond VI and protected the Friars-Preachers in their early days. The marriage (1249) of Jeanne, daughter of Raymond VII, with Alphonse de Poitiers, brother of Louis IX of France, led to the uniting in 1271 of the County of Toulouse to the Crown of France, and Toulouse became the capital of the Province of Languedoc.

The See of Toulouse was for a time made famous by St. Louis (1296–97), son of Charles II, King of Naples and the Two Sicilies, and of Mary, daughter of the King of Hungary: he was nephew of St. Elizabeth of Hungary and grand-nephew of St. Louis, King of France. Louis had resigned to his brother Robert all rights over the Kingdom of Naples, and had accepted from Pope Boniface VIII the See of Toulouse after becoming a Franciscan friar. His successor was Peter de la Chapelle Taillefer (1298–1312) who was created cardinal in 1305.

To this epoch belongs a change that took place in the history of the Diocese of Toulouse. It decreased in size but increased in dignity. Before 1295 the Diocese of Toulouse was very extensive. At the beginning of the thirteenth century Bishop Fulk had wished to divide it into several dioceses. In 1295 a portion of territory was cut off by Boniface VIII to form the Diocese of Pamiers. Then in 1319 John XXII cut off the Diocese of Toulouse from the metropolitan church of Narbonne and made it a metropolitan with the Sees of Montauban, Saint-Papoul, Rieux, and Lombez as suffragans; a little later Lavaur and Mirepoix also became suffragans of Toulouse. The majority of these sees were composed of territory cut off from the ancient See of Toulouse itself. According to Pope John XXII, not only was the diocese too large and too populated for a single bishop to carry out all of his necessary functions, but also it was immensely rich and did not spend its wealth for the growth of the faith, but on luxuries and dissipation of every sort.

Pope John XXII offered the See of Riez in Provence to Gaillard de Preyssac, Bishop of Toulouse since 1305, whom he suspected of having conspired against him with Hugues Giraud, Bishop of Cahors. Gaillard refused the offer, and retired to Avignon where he died in 1327.

The first archbishop was Raymond de Comminges, Bishop of Maguelonne from 1309, who, when created cardinal in 1327, resigned the See of Toulouse in order to take up his duties at the Papal Curia in Avignon, where he died in 1348. He left a book on the "Passion of the Saviour", and some "Sermons for Festival Days". Among his successors were: the Dominican William de Laudun (1327–1345), previously bishop of Vienne; Raymond de Canillac (1345–50), who resigned upon being named a cardinal in 1350; Cardinal Francis de Gozie (1391–92); Bernard du Rosier (1451–1474), author of two treatises on the temporal power of the pope and on the liberty of the Church, and who founded at Toulouse the College de Foix for the support of twenty-five poor scholars, where he collected one of the first libraries of the period; John of Orléans (1503–1533), cardinal in 1533.

Protestantism entered Toulouse in 1532 through foreign students. As early as 1563 the Catholics of Toulouse founded a league to uphold the prerogatives of Catholicism, protected by the Parlement but jeopardized by certain Protestant town-councillors. From 1586 to 1595 the League party under Montmorency, Governor of Languedoc, and the Duc de Joyeuse held control in Toulouse. The rule of Henry IV of France was definitively recognized there in 1596. During this period of religious unrest Toulouse had many notable archbishops: Gabriel de Gramont (1533–34), cardinal in 1530; Odet de Châtillon, Cardinal de Coligny (1534–1550), who became a Calvinist, married in 1564, and died in 1571; Anthony Sanguin (1550–1559), Cardinal de Meudon in 1539; Georges d'Armagnac (1562–1577), cardinal in 1544; François de Joyeuse (1584–1605), cardinal in 1583 and who conducted the negotiations between Henry IV and the Holy See.

Subsequent archbishops included: Louis de Nogaret (1614–1627), Cardinal de Lavalette in 1621, but who never received orders and from 1635 to 1637 led part of the French troops in the Thirty Years War; Charles de Montchal (1628–1651), who in 1635 upheld the decision of the Holy See, against the opinion of the majority of the Assembly of Clergy, that the marriages of princes of blood contracted without royal consent were not null; Pierre de Marca (1652–1662), who under Louis XIII aided largely in the re-establishment of Catholicism in Béarn, in 1621 became president of the Parlement of Béarn, was afterwards made Councillor of State by Louis XIII, and wrote a work of Gallican tendency "De concordia Sacerdotii et Imperii", a voluminous work on Spain and especially on the Province of Tarragona, and a commentary on the Psalms; he was secretary to the Assembly of the Clergy of France of April, 1656, which drew up a formula condemning the Five propositions drawn from the "Augustinus", and he died in 1662 just as he was about to take possession of the See of Paris; Pierre de Bonzy (1672–1673), cardinal in 1672; Charles Antoine de Laroche Aymon (1740–1752), cardinal in 1771; Etienne Charles de Lomenie (1763–1789), Cardinal de Brienne in 1788 (also Chief Minister of France in 1787-1788); Anne de Clermont Tonnerre (1820–1830), cardinal in 1822; Paul d'Astros (1830–1851), cardinal in 1850; Julien Desprez (1859–1895), cardinal in 1879; François-Désiré Mathieu (1896–1899), cardinal in 1899, was a member of the French Academy, wrote the history of Lorraine under the ancien regime, of the Concordat of 1801–2, and of the conclave of 1903; he died in 1908.

== Leadership ==
=== Bishops ===
- Saint Saturnin (or Saint Sernin)
- Rhodanius (Rhodane) (350–358)
- Hilarius (Saint Hilaire) (358–360)
- Saint Selve or Saint Sylve (360–400)
- Saint Exupère or Saint Spire (400– )
- Heraclius ( –506)
- Saint Germier ( –541)
- Magnulphus (Magnulphe) ( –585)
- Wilegisile ( –625)
- Saint Erembert ( –657)
- Arricius ( –785)
- Mancion ( –798)
- Samuel ( –843)
- Salomon ( –857)
- Helisachar ( –861)
- Bernard (883–890)
- Armandus (903–925)
- Hugues I (926–972)
- Atton (973–974)
- Isolus (974–986)
- Attus (990–1000)
- Raymond (1004–1010)
- Pierre Roger (1018–1031)
- Arnaud (1031–1035)
- Bernard (1035–1040)
- Hugues II (1041–1044)
- Arnaud (1045–1059)
- Durand de Breton (1059–1070) (Durand de Bredons)
- Izarn (1071–1105)
- Amelius Raymond du Puy (1105–1139)
- Raymond de Lautrec (1140–1163)
- Bernard Bonhomme (1163–1164)
- Gérard de Labarthe (1164–1170)
- Hugues III (1170–1175)
- Bertrand de Villemur (1175–1178)
- Gausselin (1178–1178)
- Fulcrand (1179–1200)
- Raymond de Rabastens (1203–1206)
- Foulques de Marseille (1206–1231)
- Raymond du Falga (1232–1279)
- Bertrand de l'Isle-Jourdain (1270–1286)
- Hugues Mascaron (1286–1296)
- Saint Louis d'Anjou-Sicile (1296–1297)
- Arnaud-Roger de Comminges 1297–1298
- Pierre de la Chapelle Taillefer (1298–1305), cardinal in 1305
- Gaillard de Preyssac (1305–1317), resigned in 1317, died 1327

=== Archbishops ===
- Jean Raymond de Comminges (1318–1327) (previously Bishop of Maguelonne)
- Guillaume de Laudun (1327–1345)
- Raymond de Canillac (1346–1350)
- Etienne Aldobrandi (Stefano Aldebrandi Cambaruti) (1350–1361)
- Geofrroy de Vayroles (1379–1390)
- Jean de Cardailhac (1379–1390)
- François de Conzie (1390–1391)
- Pierre de Saint Martial (1391–1401)
- Vital de Castelmourou (1401–1410)
- Dominique de Flourence (1410–1422)
- Denys du Moulin (1423–1439)
- Pierre du Moulin (1439–1451)
- Bernard du Rosier (1452–1475)
- Pierre de Lyon (1475–1491)
- Hector de Bourbon (1491–1502)
- Jean d'Orléans-Longueville (1503–1533)
- Gabriel de Gramont (1533–1534)
- Odet de Coligny (1534–1550)
- Antoine Sanguin (1551–1559)
- Robert de Lenoncourt (d. 1561) (1560–1561)
- Georges d'Armagnac (1562–1583)
- Paul de Foix (1583–1584)
- François de Joyeuse (1588–1614) (also Archbishop of Rouen)
- Louis de Nogaret de La Valette d'Épernon (1614–1628)
- Charles de Montchal (1628–1651)
- Pierre de Marca (1654–1662) (also Archbishop of Paris)
- Charles-François d'Anglure de Bourlemont (1664–1669)
- Pierre de Bonzi (1672–1673)
- Joseph de Montpezat de Carbon (1675–1687)
- Jean-Baptiste-Michel Colbert de Villacerf (1693–1710)
- René-François de Beauveau de Rivau (1714–1721) (also Bishop of Narbonne)
- Henri de Nesmond (1722–1727)
- Jean-Louis de Balbis-Berton de Crillon (1728–1740)
- Charles Antoine de La Roche-Aymon (1740–1753) (also Bishop of Narbonne, Bishop of Tarbes and Archbishop of Reims)
- François de Crussol d'Uzès (1753–1758)
- Arthur Richard Dillon (1758–1762) (also Bishop of Narbonne)
- Étienne-Charles de Loménie de Brienne (1763–1788) (also Archbishop of Sens)
- François de Fontanges (1788–1801) (also Archbishop of Bourges)
- Claude-François-Marie Primat (1802–1816)
- François de Bovet (1817–1820)
- Anne-Antoine-Jules de Clermont-Tonnerre (1820–1830)
- Paul-Thérèse-David d'Astros (1830–1851)
- Jean-Marie Mioland (1851–1859)
- Florian Desprez (1859–1895)
- François-Désiré Mathieu (1896–1899)
- Jean-Augustin Germain (1899–1928)
- Jules-Géraud Saliège (1928–1956)
- Gabriel-Marie Garrone (1956–1966)
- Louis-Jean-Frédéric Guyot (1966–1978)
- André Charles Collini (1978–1996)
- Émile Marcus, P.S.S. (1996–2006)
- Robert Le Gall, O.S.B. (2006–2021)
- Guy de Kerimel (2021–present)

== See also ==
- Catholic Church in France
