= Artus Legoust =

French sculptor

- Born: Artus Legoust; 1580; Bourges, France
- Died: 1630 (aged 49–50); Toulouse, France
- Known for: Sculpture

Artus Legoust (Arthur Legoust) is a French sculptor (1580?, Bourges, 1630? Toulouse). He was the most notable sculptor in Toulouse in the 17th century.

His active years span between 1607 and 1629 during which he provided many altarpieces and tabernacles for Toulouse and its region, even as far as Bordeaux and Limoges.

Legoust lived at number 3 rue Cantegril in Toulouse from 22 October 1620 onwards.

Legoust worked with other sculptors, in particular Pierre II Souffron who was his friend. The latter's wife, Barthélemye Rouède, was the godmother of Legoust's first boy and Saffron himself was godfather of Legoust's second boy.

One of his students was Pierre Affre.

== Works ==
- Equestrian statue representing Louis XIII, trampling on heresy on the Place Mage in Toulouse (1620), destroyed by an administrative decree of August 24, 1792.
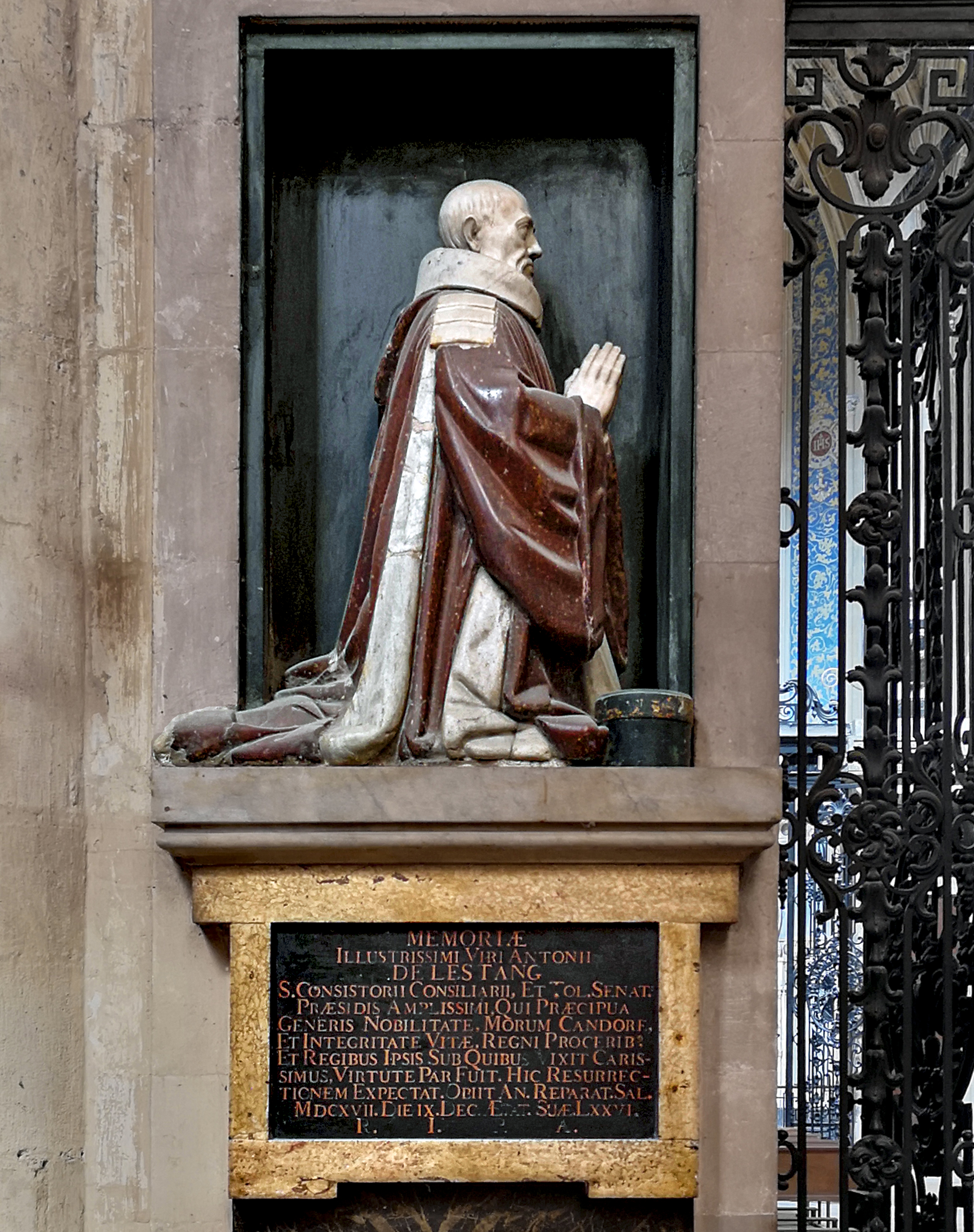
Grave of Antoine de Lestang - Toulouse cathedral

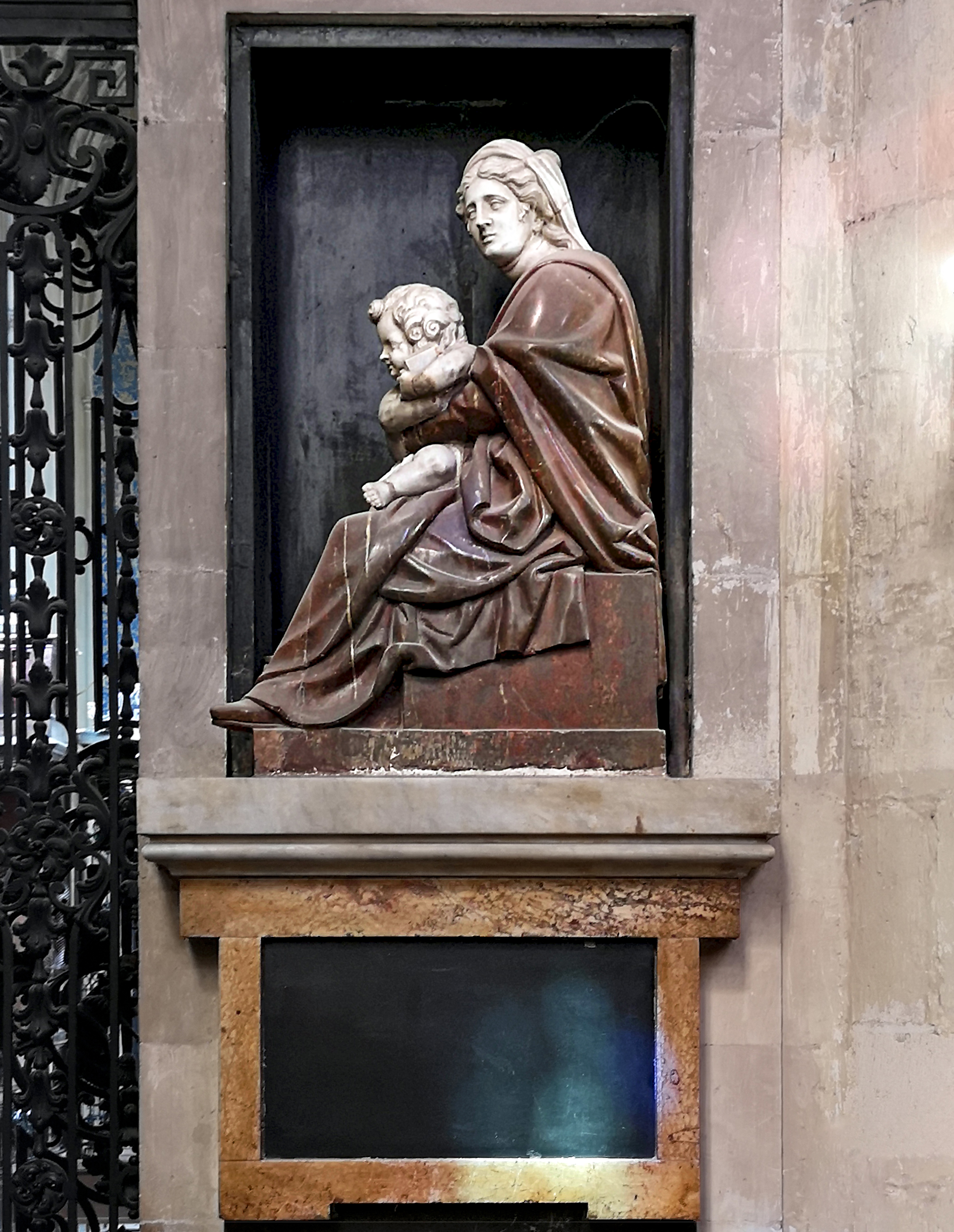
Virgin and child Toulouse cathedral

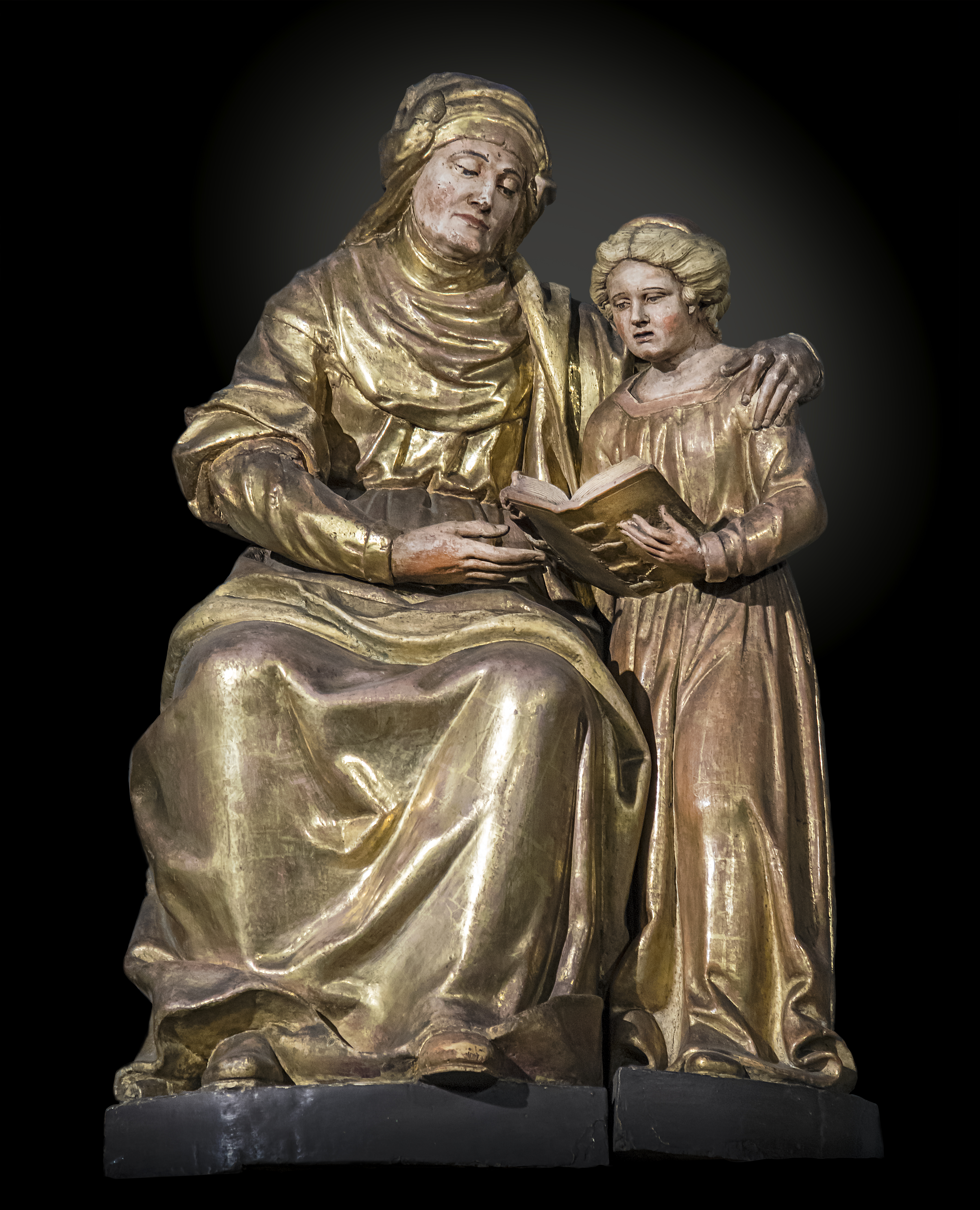
Education of the Virgin Mary, 1627, Notre-Dame du Taur

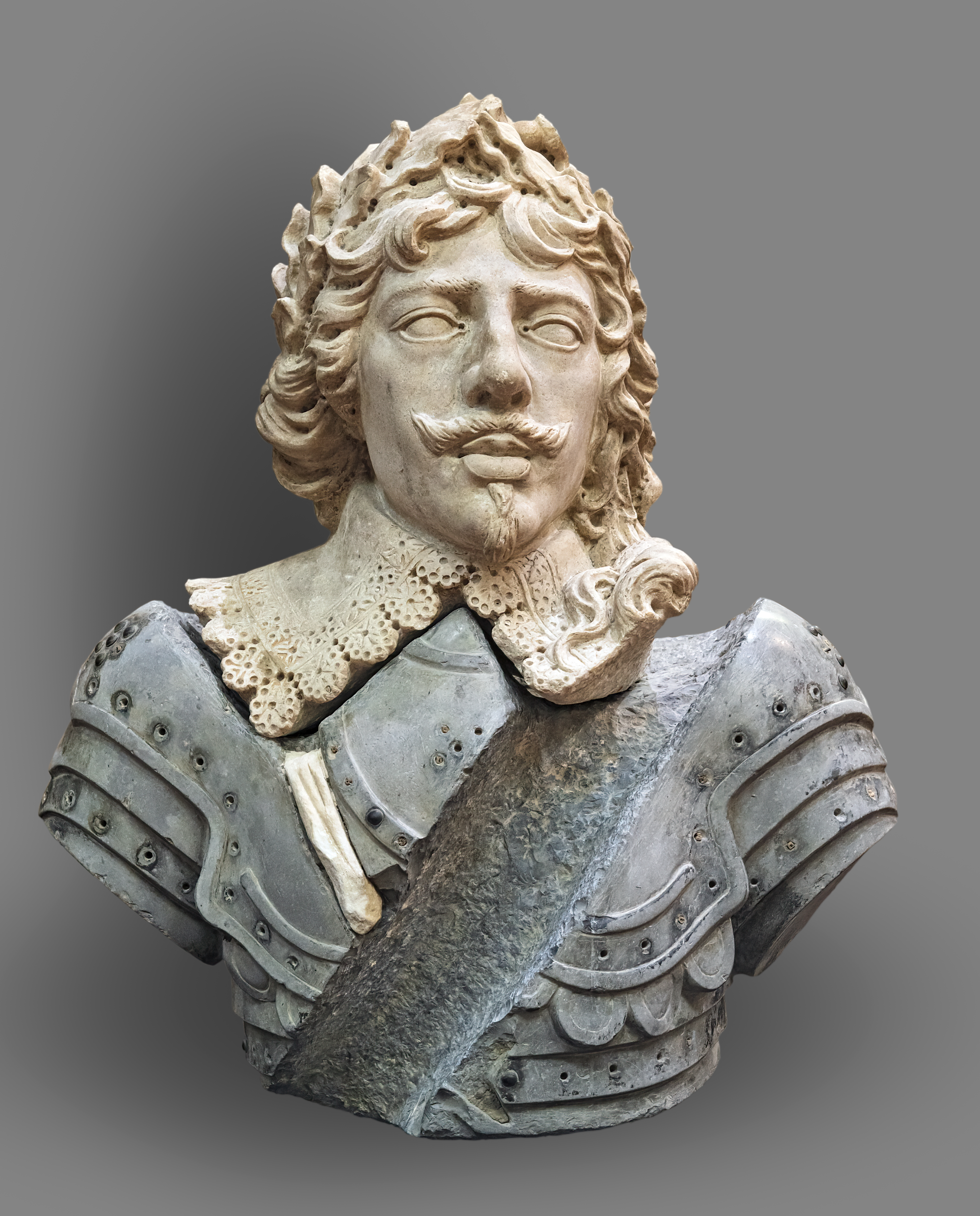
Louis XIII, 1620, musée des Augustins.

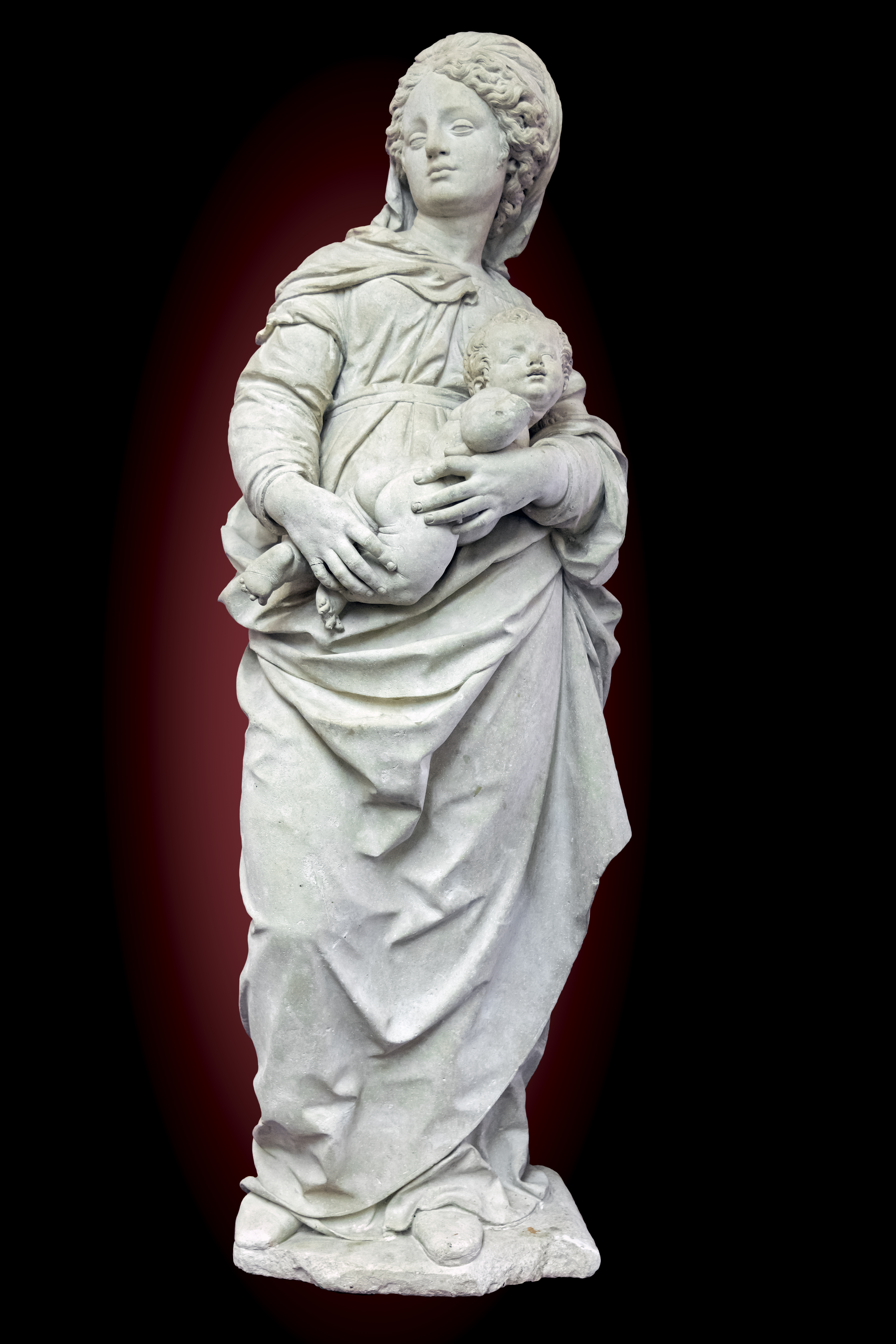
Vierge à l'Enfant,1624, Musée du Vieux Toulouse

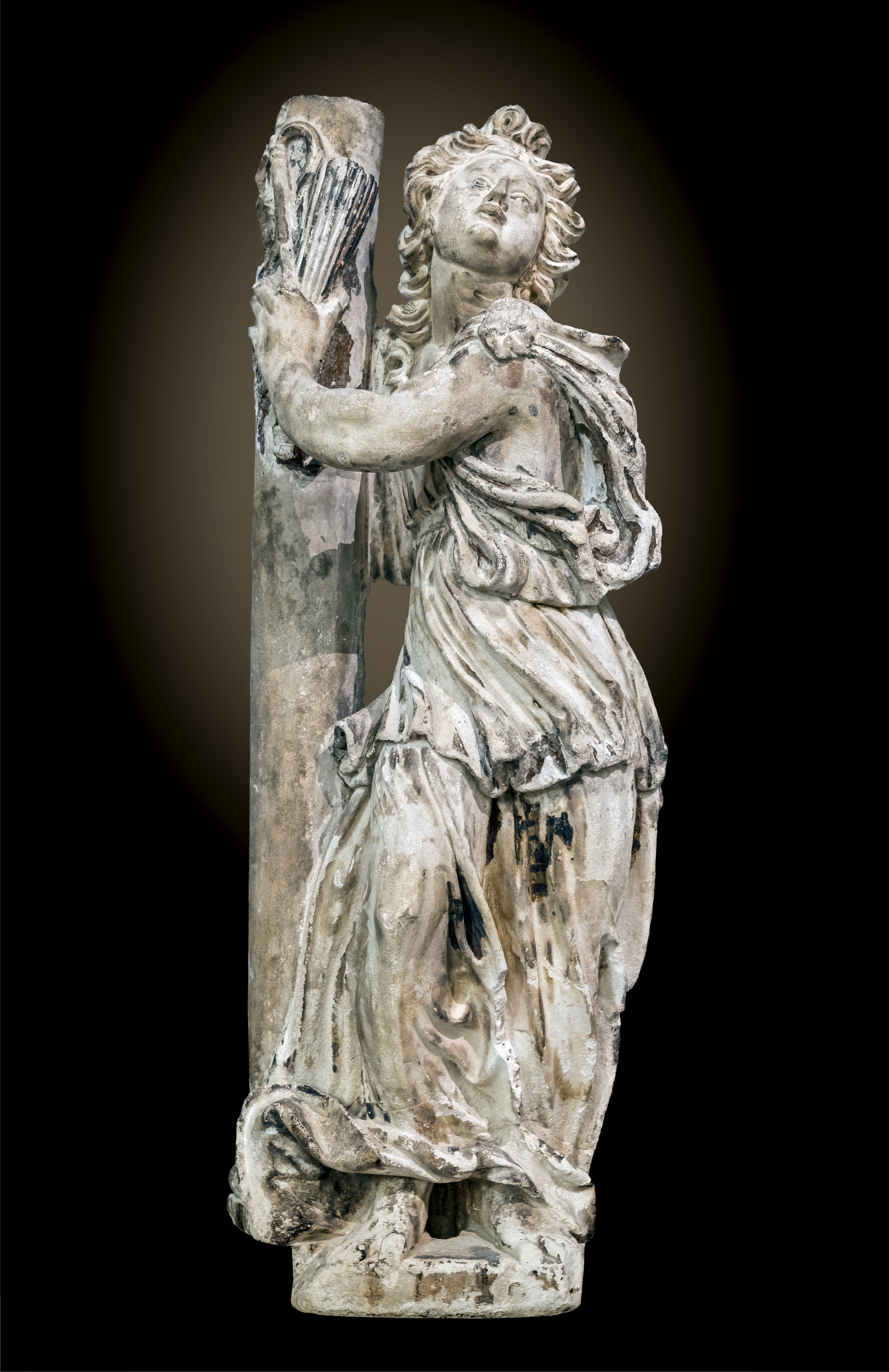
Angel holding the tools of the Passion, musée des Augustins.

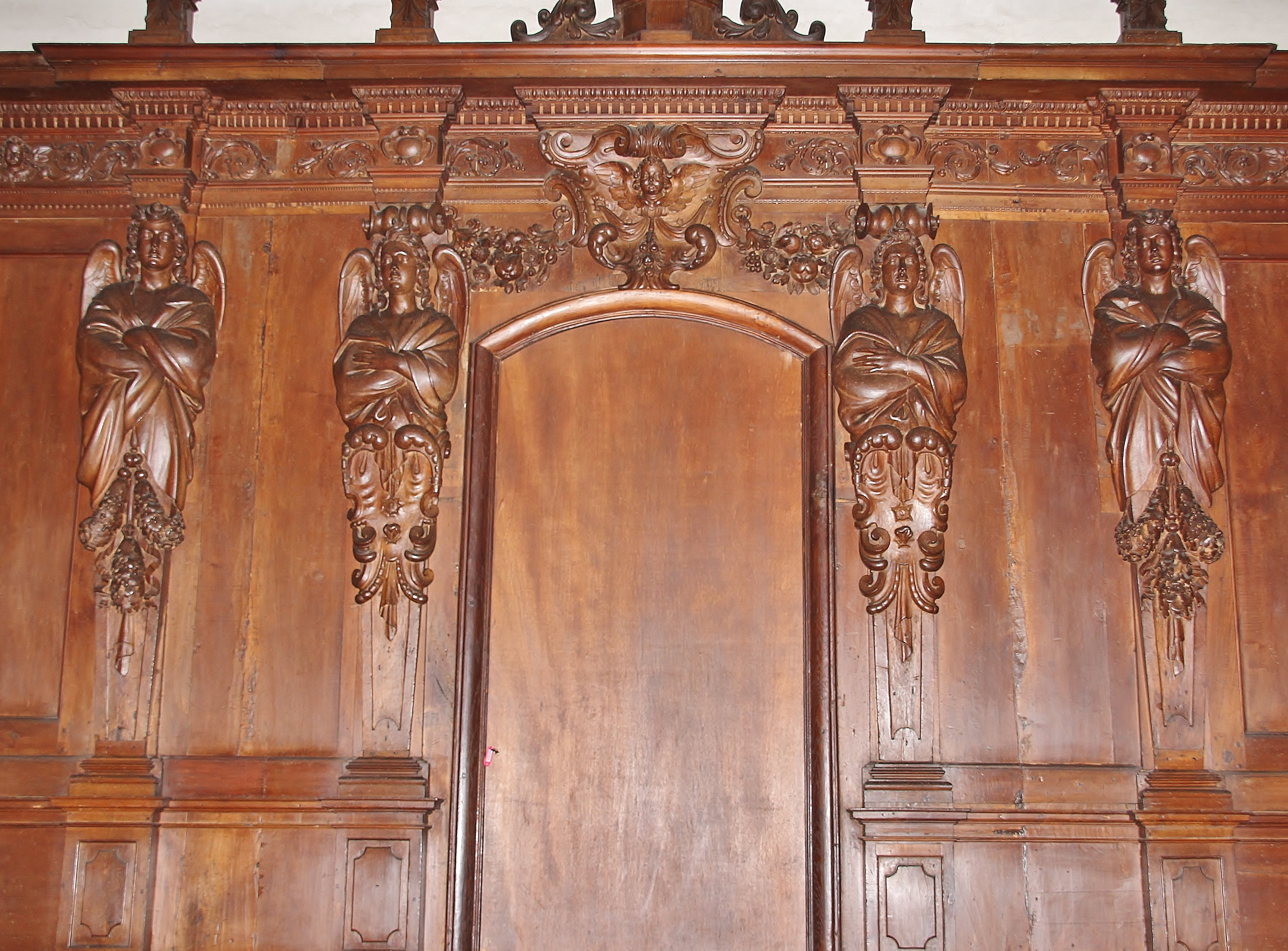
Wood carvings in the Chapel of the Holy Cross in the church of Saint-Pierre des Chartreux in Toulouse.
