= Affré =

Affré or Affre is a French surname. Notable people with the surname include:

- Agustarello Affre (1858–1931), French operatic tenor
- Denis Auguste Affre (1793–1848), Archbishop of Paris
- Pierre Affre (1590–1669), French sculptor
