= Claude Pacot =

French architect

- Occupation: Architect
- Spouse: Anne Panassier
- Children: 4

Claude Pacot was a French architect in the 17th century. He designed many hôtels particuliers in Toulouse. He also designed new facades on the National Square in Montauban after the fire of 1646, based on the 1614 designs of architect Pierre Levesville. Additionally, he restored a statue of Clémence Isaure on the Capitole de Toulouse with Pierre Affre.
