= Saint-Jérôme Church (Toulouse) =

Church from 17th century

Coordinates: 43.6033°N 1.4462°E

Church of Saint-Jérôme (former chapel of the Pénitents bleus)
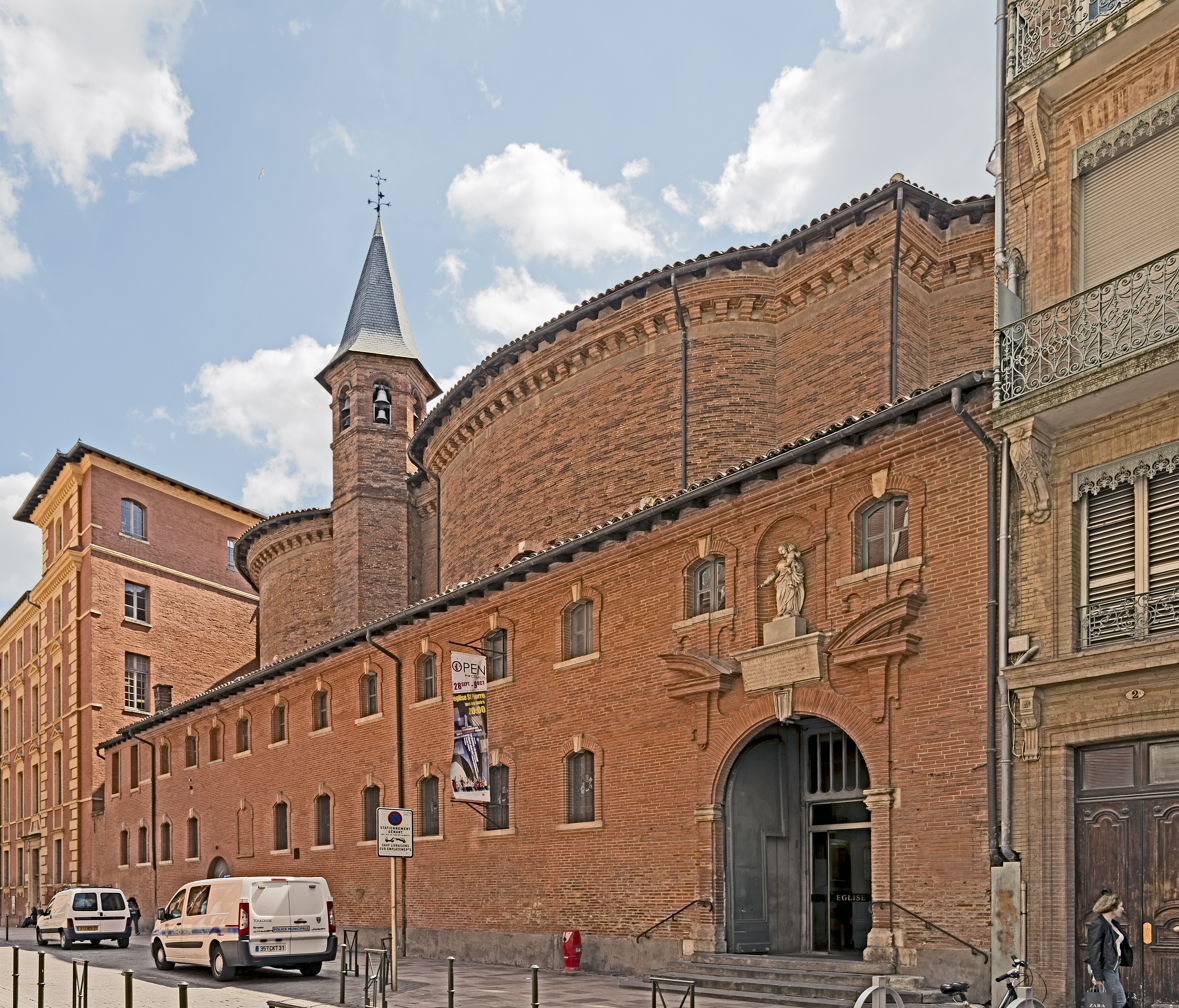
- Church of Saint-Jérôme

Religion
- Affiliation: Catholic
- District: Toulouse
- Province: Haute-Garonne
- Region: Occitanie
- Patron: Saint Jérôme

Location
- Country: France
- Interactive map of Church of Saint-Jérôme (former chapel of the Pénitents bleus)

Architecture
- Type: Chapel
- Style: Baroque architecture
- Completed: 1629

The church of the Sanctuaire Saint-Jérôme (former chapel of the Pénitents bleus), rue du Lieutenant-Colonel-Pélissier (former rue des Pénitents bleus), is a church built by the Compagnie royale des Pénitents bleus de Toulouse. It was built in the 17th century by architect Pierre Levesville under Louis XIII, the first French king to join the brotherhood. The Pénitents bleus called on Toulouse's finest artists to decorate their chapel, which didn't suffer too much during the French Revolution.

== History ==
The first meeting of the fraternity was held on 29 September 1575 in the chapel of the Collège Saint-Martial in Toulouse (where the Grand Hôtel de l'Opéra now stands). In the year of its foundation, the fraternity moved to the pré Montardy (now rue Montardy), in an unoccupied church belonging to the monks of Saint-Antoine de Vienne (now salle Osète, at the corner of rue Saint-Antoine-du-T, next to the Duranti library), which they dedicated to Saint Jérôme. But the owners would reclaim their property, so they had to think about moving. They began construction of a new church in 1614, which lasted until 1617. Pierre Hurault, the king's architect, lent the fraternity 3,000 livres to finance the new church. Among the signatories to the contracts was Jacques Lemercier, who had been sent to Toulouse in 1613 to take measures for the completion of the Pont-Neuf. A ruling by the King's Council on 11 September 1620 obliged the Blue Penitents to return the building to the previous owners, which they did in 1626, after having had the Saint-Jérôme church built.

The new chapel was built in 1622 by architect Pierre Levesville. The foundation stone was laid by the Bishop of Pamiers, Mgr d'Esparbès de Lussan, on behalf of King Louis XIII. The shell of the chapel was completed in 1626. All that remained was to complete the ornamentation. As the decoration of the vault had been planned at the same time as the decision to build the chapel, it was probably completed in early 1627, when the fraternity left the former Saint-Jérôme chapel, which had been returned to the monks of Saint-Antoine de Vienne, to move into its "esglise à neuf bastie".

Following the dissolution of the brotherhood in 1792, the chapel became a decadal temple dedicated to the ceremonies of the Supreme Being during the French Revolution, and then a parish church in 1801 under the name of Saint-Jérôme, which it still carries today in the Saint-Jérôme sanctuary since 2016.

When the chapel became a parish church in 1805, Toulouse city architect Jacques-Pascal Virebent was commissioned to adapt the building to its new function. The chapel had to be enlarged. To preserve the essence of the original plan, the architect chose to knock down the dividing wall between the chapel and the confraternity meeting room, and to place the high altar in the former confraternity meeting room. Above the altar, he placed Guillaume Lethière's painting "The Allegory of the Cross" (1788). The two rotundas were then covered by plaster domes on lath. He built a small hexagonal bell tower between the two rotundas, on the street side.

Jean-Louis Ajon designed the pulpit after 1805, based on a drawing by Jacques-Pascal Virebent. Two cenotaphs have been erected in memory of François Lucas and Bernard Lange on the right side of the nave, and of Jacques-Pascal Virebent in 1834–1835 on the left side.

In 1857–1858, architect Henri Bach (1815–1899) had the choir decorated along the same lines as the nave. Mathieu, a sculptor from Toulouse, created historiated bas-reliefs. The false domes are decorated with paintings by Céroni and Justin Pibou, which have now disappeared. The stained-glass windows were created by Paul Chalon.

The church was listed as a monument historique in 1980.

== Architecture and fittings ==
=== Interior ===
The church is oriented west to east, with the Bon secours chapel on the north flank and the Très Saint Sacrement chapel, sacristy and St. Joseph chapel on the south flank.

==== Organs ====
The church has a gallery organ and a choir organ.

==== Chapels ====
- Notre Dame de Bon Secours chapel, to the left of the central nave, was completely restored in 2009 by the Association pour la Sauvegarde du Patrimoine de l'Eglise St Jérôme (gilding of the altarpiece, woodwork, baptismal font grilles, restoration of the statue of Notre Dame de Bon Secours, creation of an altar, two polychrome chandeliers and replacement of six stained glass windows).
- The chapel of the Blessed Sacrament is on the right of the nave.
- It is followed by the chapel of Saint Joseph, on the same side.

==== Le Passage ====
The church is unusual in that it has two entrances, one on rue du Lieutenant-Colonel-Pélissier and the other on rue de la Pomme. They are linked to the church by a gallery known as the "Passage Saint-Jérôme", which features a number of showcases displaying ecclesiastical works of art. These include a 19th-century vermeil monstrance-reliquary and illuminations by Jean Bourdichon.

== Gallery ==
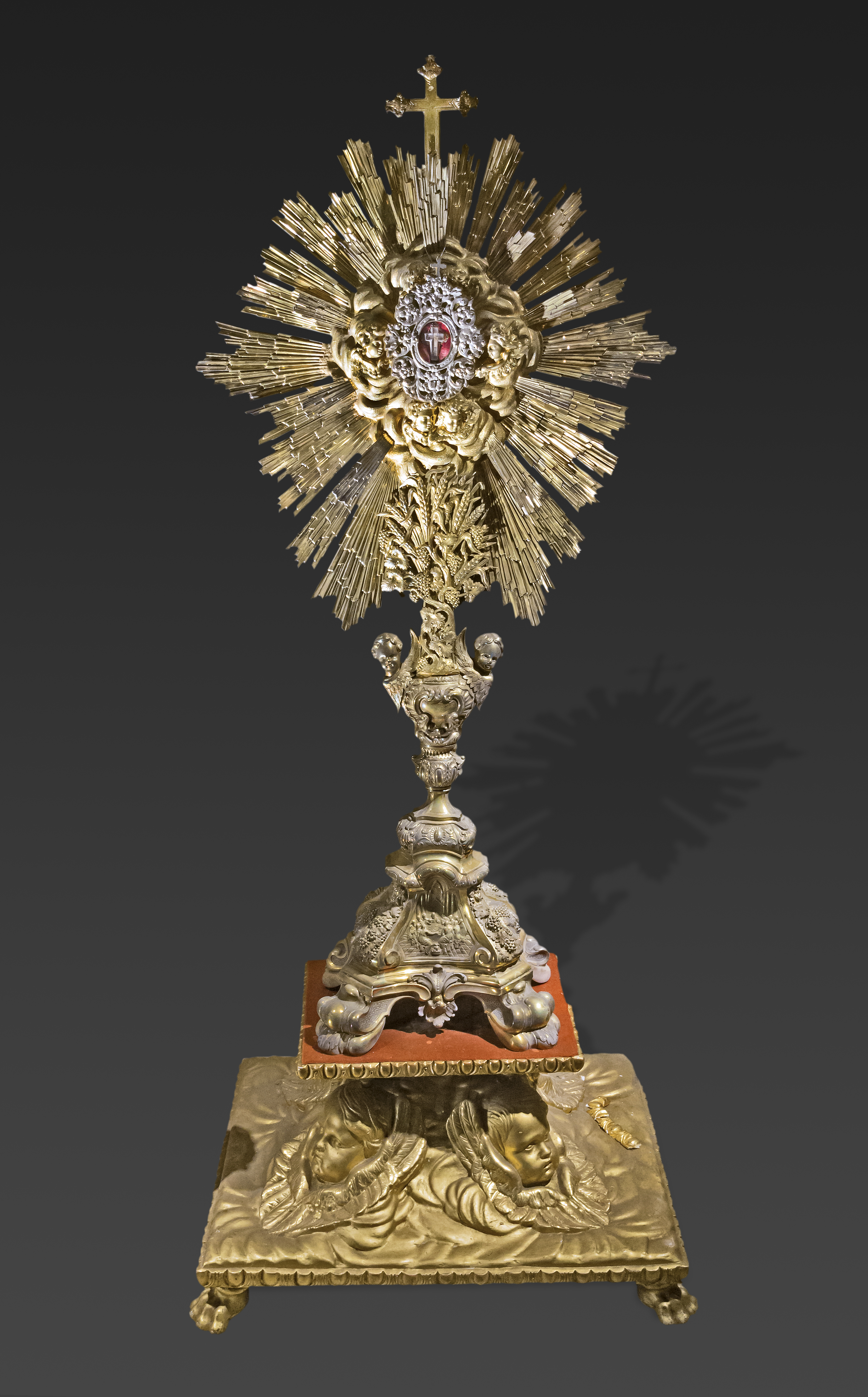
Reliquary Monstrance of the True Cross in the "Passage Saint-Jérôme

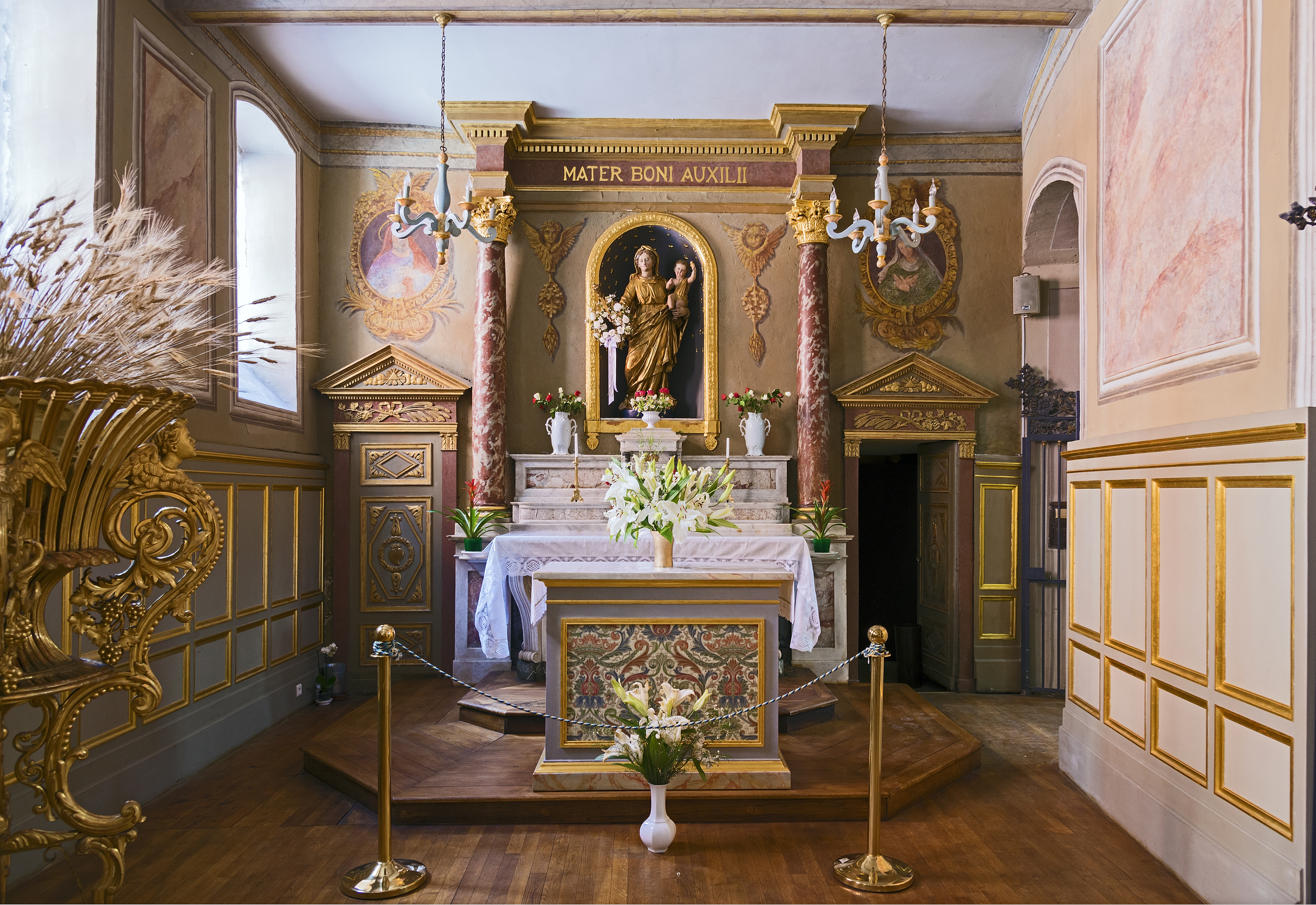
Notre Dame du Bon Secours chapel

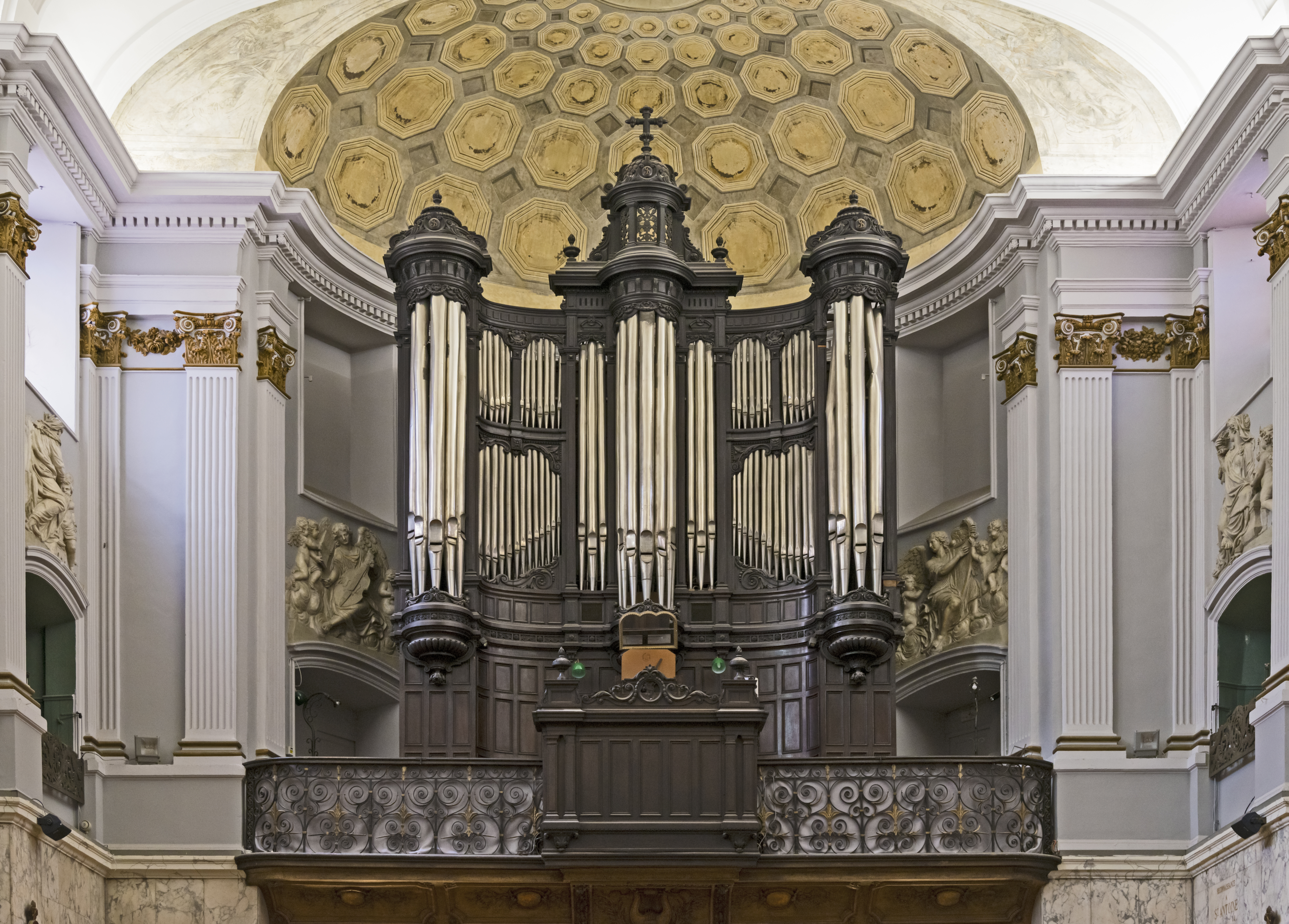
Tribune organ

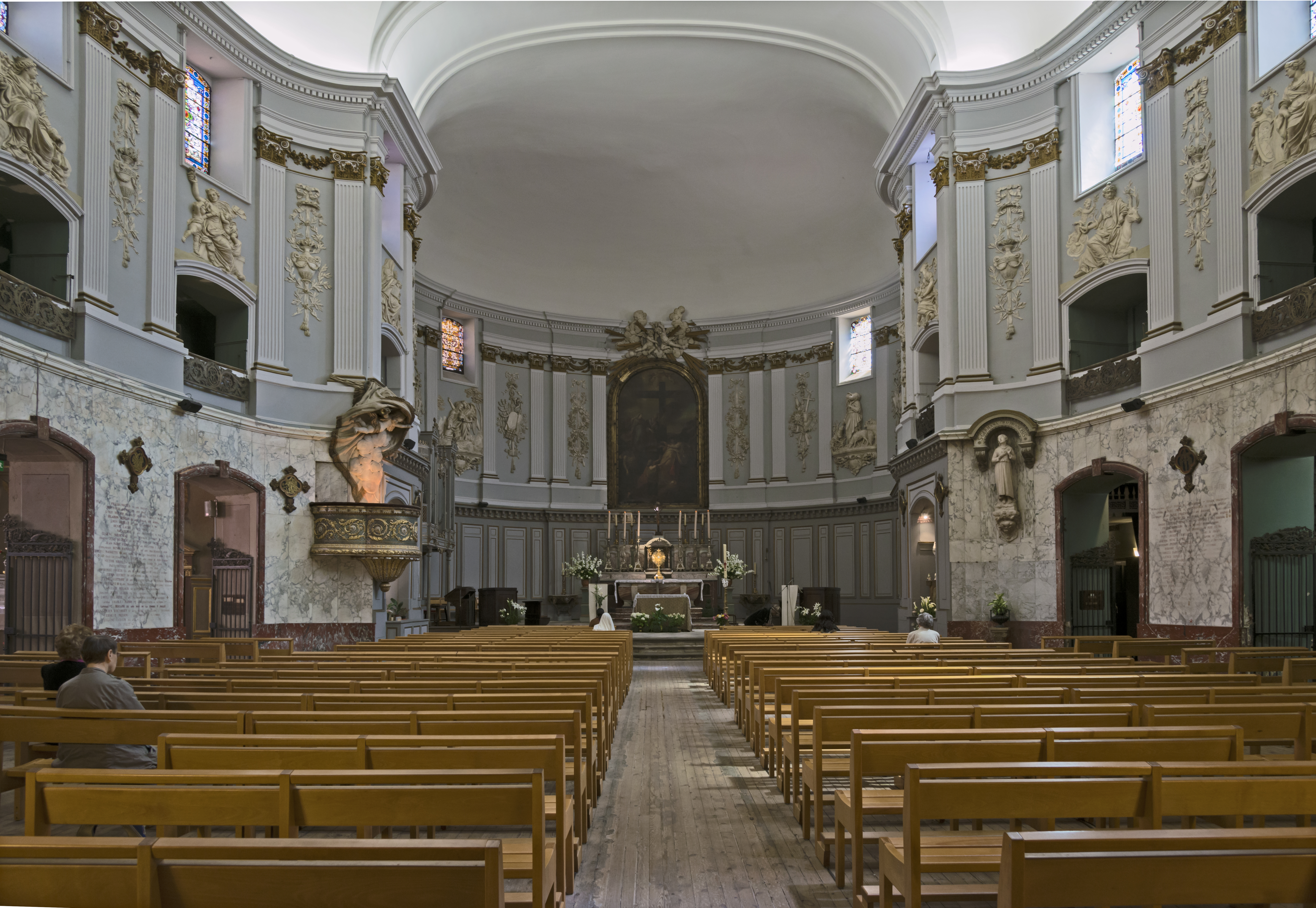
Nave and choir

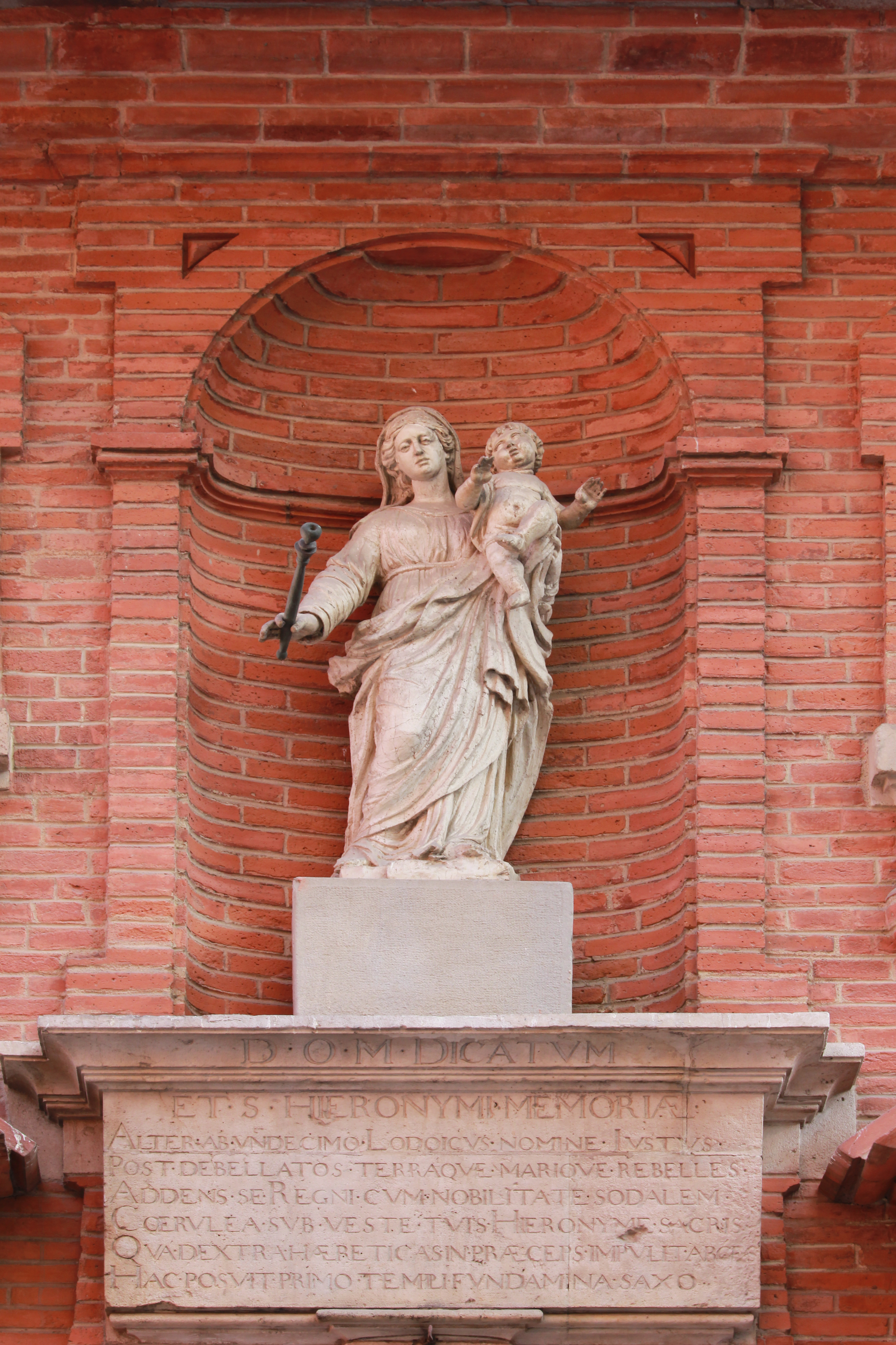
Virgin and Child

== See also ==
- Confraternity of penitents
- Pierre Levesville
- Jacques Lemercier

== Bibliography ==
- Costa, Georges (2002). L'église Saint-Jérôme, ancienne chapelle des Pénitents Bleus de Toulouse. Paris: Société Française d'Archéologie. pp. 235–244.
- Ousset, Pierre-Exupère (1932). "La décoration de la chapelle des Pénitents bleus au xviie siècle". Mémoires de la Société archéologique du Midi de la France (18): 84–95.
