= Pierre Souffron =

Under the name Pierre Souffron are two brother architects from Périgord, sons of Jean Souffron.

It is quite difficult to distinguish them because they have worked in the same region, perhaps together and curiously have the same first name.

Can it be assumed that Pierre I worked mainly in Guyenne and that Pierre II exercised his art in Armagnac and Toulouse? Doubts may exist as for the attribution of the Château de Cadillac from 1599 to 1603 then for the Château de Poyanne between the two Pierre Souffron.

== Pierre I Souffron ==
Pierre I Souffron, or Pierre Souffron the elder, was born in La Roque-Gageac around 1555 and died in La Réole in 1621.

He married Guillardine Marmande, sister of a notary of La Réole. He had a son, Jean Souffron, first a man of arms in the German Boissy Regiment before becoming a lawyer in the Bordeaux Parliament, and a daughter, Madeleine.

He also had a brother, Eyméric, ordinary commissioner of the king's artillery, and a sister, Madeleine, who married Domenge de La Porterie, master mason in Marmande who built the Villeneuve-d'Agen bridge. His sister, now a widow, remarried at Cadillac Castle on August 8, 1601.

It is said to be the lord of the noble house of Cros, or of Cos, architect for the king in his duchy of Albret, architect for the king in his house of Navarre.

In 1609, he was called upon to inspect the work done at the Auch Cathedral by his brother.

In P. Palanque's article on "Pierre Souffron, master architect of the city of Auch" he attributes to his brother titles that belong to him. He was probably in Auch in 1594 when he signed, with the architect Pierre Lemoyne, the contract to demolish the castle of Rabastens at the request of Jacques II de Goyon de Matignon. The work was paid for in 1595.

== Pierre II Souffron ==
Pierre II Souffron, or Pierre Souffron the younger, was born in La Roque-Gageac around 1558 and died in Toulouse on 26 October 1649.

He married Barthélemye Rouède, sister of Pierre Rouède, Canon of the Cathedral and Abbot of Sère, in Auch on 9 December 1588. It is stated in the marriage contract originating from Sarlat and master architect of the cathedral. From his marriage he had a son and a daughter. The son, Jean, bought on March 13, 1624 the charge of receiver of Armagnac sizes for 22000 livres and died in 1631 without children. His daughter, Anne, married Jean Nogaro, a doctor and lawyer in parliament, on 17 January 1614, and had a son, Pierre. She married noble Jean de Chavaille, sieur de Colomé, of whom she had two daughters.

He was master architect of the city of Auch. He was designated as "master architect of the building of the cathedral church of Aux" in 1594. On the Cathedral of St. Mary of Auch, he mainly intervened on the maintenance of the church and the canonical buildings. The vaults of the choir were laid by Pierre Levesville between 1618 and 1620, and in 1609 he built the main altar of the choir.

He was working on the cathedral of Sainte-Marie d'Auch when the curators of the Toulouse bridge decided to associate an expert to Dominique Capmartin. the new Master of the Royal Works and Repairs of the Senechausea of Toulouse. On May 8, 1597, the clerk of the commission noted that arriva en Tholoze Pierre Souffron, Me architecte en la fabrique de l’églize Ste-Marie d’Auch, mandé venir exprès par lesd Sieurs Commissaires pour l’employer à l'œuvre du pont. The next day he went to visit the construction site of the Pont Neuf, Toulouse with Capmartin.

By an act concluded on 31 May 1594, his father, Jean Souffron, a native of La Roque-Gaugeac, a resident of the town of Lauzun in Agenais, gave him 400 écus sol, and de la part qu'il a sur le moulin de Laucque, sur la rivière du Dropt en la terre de Caissac en Agenois.

On June 3, 1606, "Pierre Souffron, architect of the church of Sainte-Marie d'Aux and builder of the bridge of Saint Subran de Tholoze", made a deal with Messyre Jean de Bessoles, seigneur dudict lieu, Boumont (Beaumont, near Condom), Moissan et autres places. Souffron undertook to build the castle of Beaumont in eighteen months.

Between 1609 and 1612, he was the architect of the Hotel de Clari, Hôtel de Bagis or stone hotel of Toulouse where he built the wing with the stone facade on the street.

From 1624 he founded the Jesuit College. The first stone was laid on September 10, 1624 and the blessing of the chapel was given by Archbishop Leonard de Trappes on July 31, 1627.

After his wife's death on August 21, 1642, he remarried in 1646 to Jeanne Galinier, daughter of a painter from Toulouse, and widow of Antoine Pourchet, master apothecary of Saint-Félix-de-Caraman. He then left Auch to settle in Toulouse in a house owned by his wife. His grandson, Pierre Nogaro, opposed this marriage before the official of Auch. Pierre Nogaro, grandson of Pierre Souffron was married on June 27, 1644 with Marie de Chanaille by the Vicar General of the Archbishop of Auch.

On April 3, 1646, he gave his nephew, Jean Souffron, a lawyer at the Bordeaux Parliament, power of attorney to go to the King's Council in Paris to plead his case because he was owed 70000 livres for the materials of the Pont Neuf de Toulouse and obtain an order to pay these sums.

On 24 August 1649 he gave a power of attorney to a merchant in Toulouse for the sale of the houses and property he owned in Auch.

== Bibliography ==
- under the direction of Georges Courtès, Le Gers. Dictionnaire biographique de l'Antiquité à nos jours, p. 325, Société archéologique du Gers, Auch, 1999 ISBN 2-9505900-1-2
- Charles Palanque, Pierre Souffron, maître-architecte de la ville d'Auch, p. 53-67, Revue de Gascogne, 1889, volume 30 (read online)
- Charles Palanque, Pierre Souffron, maître-architecte de la ville d'Auch, 1565-1644, Imprimerie de G. Foix, Auch, 1889
- Charles Braquehaye, Les architectes, sculpteurs, peintres et tapissiers du duc d'Epernon à Cadillac, p. 183, 185-186, Réunion des sociétés savantes des départements à la Sorbonne. Section des beaux-arts, Ministère de l'instruction publique, 1884, 8e session (read online)
- Charles Braquehaye, Pierre Souffron, p. 835-868, Réunion des sociétés savantes des départements à la Sorbonne. Section des beaux-arts, Ministère de l'instruction publique, 1895, 19e session (read online)
- T. de L., Notes divers : L'architecte Pierre Souffron à Auch, p. 85, Revue de Gascogne, 1896-2 (read online)
- Charles Braquehaye, Les artistes et artisans employés par les ducs d'Épernon, à Cadillac (notices biographiques) : Pierre Souffron, p. 117-126, in Documents pour servir à l'histoire des arts en Guienne. Les artistes du duc d'Epernon, Feret et fils, Bordeaux, 1897 (read online)
- Georges Costa, Pierre Souffron, Arthur Legoust, et le monument funéraire du Président de Clary, p. 93-99, in Mémoires de la Société Archéologique du Midi de la France, 1985-1986, volume 46 (read online)
- Georges Costa, L’œuvre de Pierre Souffron au Pont Neuf de Toulouse, p. 155-176, dans Mémoires de la Société Archéologique du Midi de la France, 2000, volume 60 (read online)
- Georges Costa, La collection et les testaments de l’architecte Souffron, p. 247-261, in Mémoires de la Société Archéologique du Midi de la France, 2009, volume 69 (read online)
