= Notre-Dame du Taur =

Medieval-era Roman Catholic church in Toulouse, France

Coordinates: 43°36′20.16″N 1°26′34.48″E

Our Lady of Taur
- Notre-Dame du Taur
- French: Église Notre-Dame du Taur; Occitan: Glèisa de Nòstra Dòna del Taur
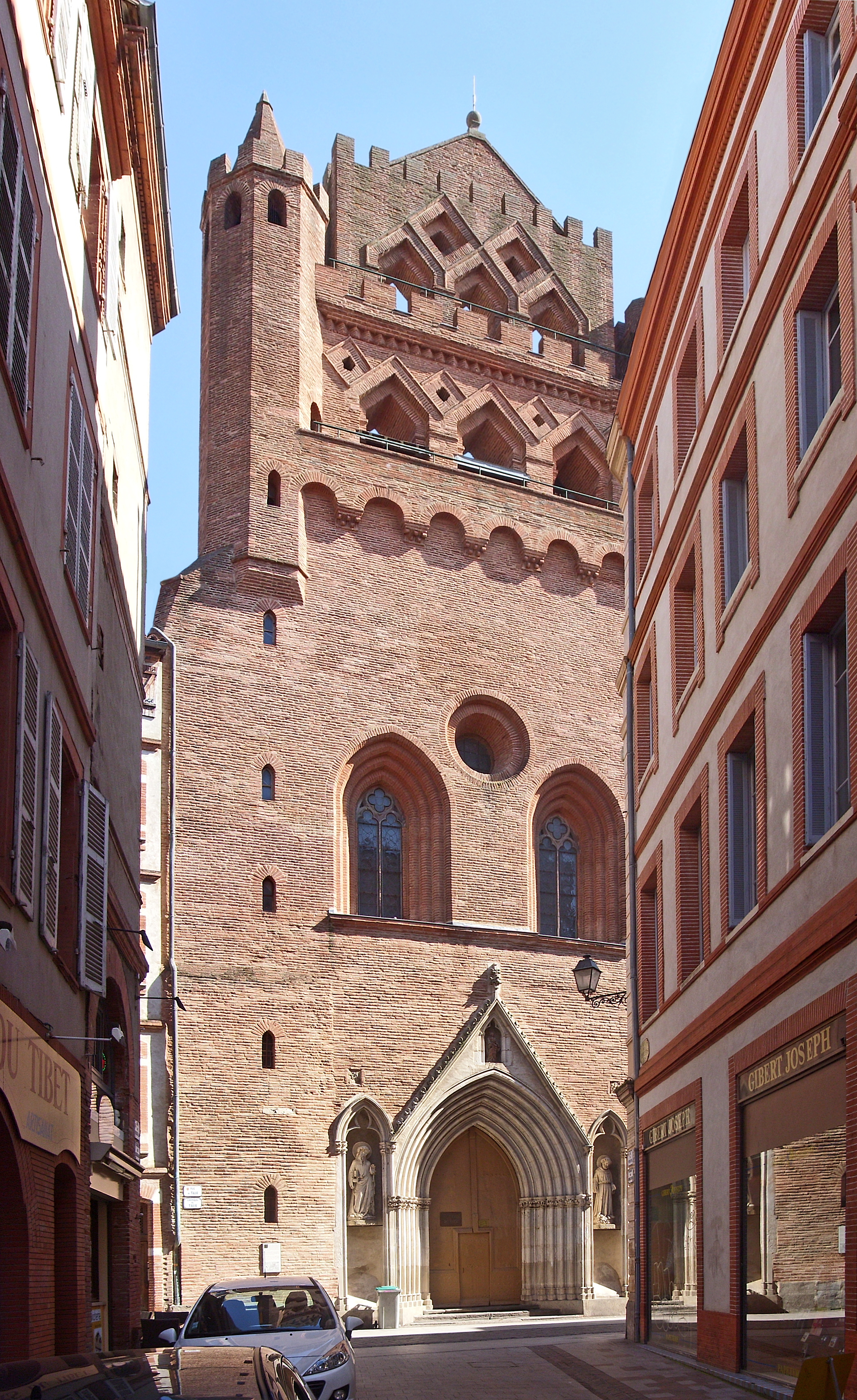
- Façade of Notre-Dame du Taur: clocher-mur
- Our Lady of Taur
- Location: Toulouse, Haute-Garonne, Occitania
- Address: 12 rue du Taur
- Country: France
- Denomination: Roman Catholic
- Website: basilique-saint-sernin.fr/nd-du-taur/

History
- Former name(s): Église Saint-Sernin du Taur; Église du Taur
- Status: Filial church
- Dedication: Virgin Mary
- Earlier dedication: Saturnin

Architecture
- Functional status: Active
- Architectural type: Hall church
- Style: Meridional Gothic; Brick Gothic
- Years built: 14th–16th centuries

Specifications
- Height: 42 m (137 ft 10 in)
- Materials: Brick

Administration
- Archdiocese: Toulouse
- Parish: Basilica of St-Sernin

Monument historique
- Official name: Église Notre-Dame-du-Taur
- Type: Classé
- Designated: 1840
- Reference no.: PA00094521

Notre-Dame du Taur is a Roman Catholic church located in Toulouse, France. According to legend, the edifice was built on the exact spot where the body of Saint Saturnin (Sernin), patron saint of Toulouse, became detached from the bull that dragged the martyr to his death. The church stands in the rue du Taur between the Capitole and the Basilica of St. Sernin. It has been classified as a historic monument since 1840.

== Etymology ==
Sernin, as in Saint Sernin to whom Notre-Dame du Taur was originally dedicated, derives from the Latin name Saturninus.

Taur, bull, the instrument of the martyrdom of Saint Sernin, derives from Latin taurus, and is cognate with Standard French taureau.

== History ==
The church of Notre-Dame du Taur occupies the site where, according to legend, the body of Saint Saturnin, first bishop of Toulouse, martyred in 250, became detached from the bull that had dragged him to his death. The body was buried where it fell, and an oratory was constructed.

Toulouse being an important stage on one of the main routes of pilgrimage to the shrine of Santiago de Compostela, pilgrims would pause to honor the saint at his tomb. Eventually, their numbers became so great that in the 11th century, a larger church was built to accommodate them, the present-day Basilica of Saint-Sernin, to which Saturnin's bones were also transferred.

The present building, originally Saint-Sernin du Taur, was constructed between the 14th and 16th centuries. In 1783 a gatehouse in Toulouse's city wall was demolished, and the statue of the Virgin Mary, which had been located in an oratory there was moved to Saint-Sernin du Taur, which accordingly then took the name Notre-Dame du Taur.

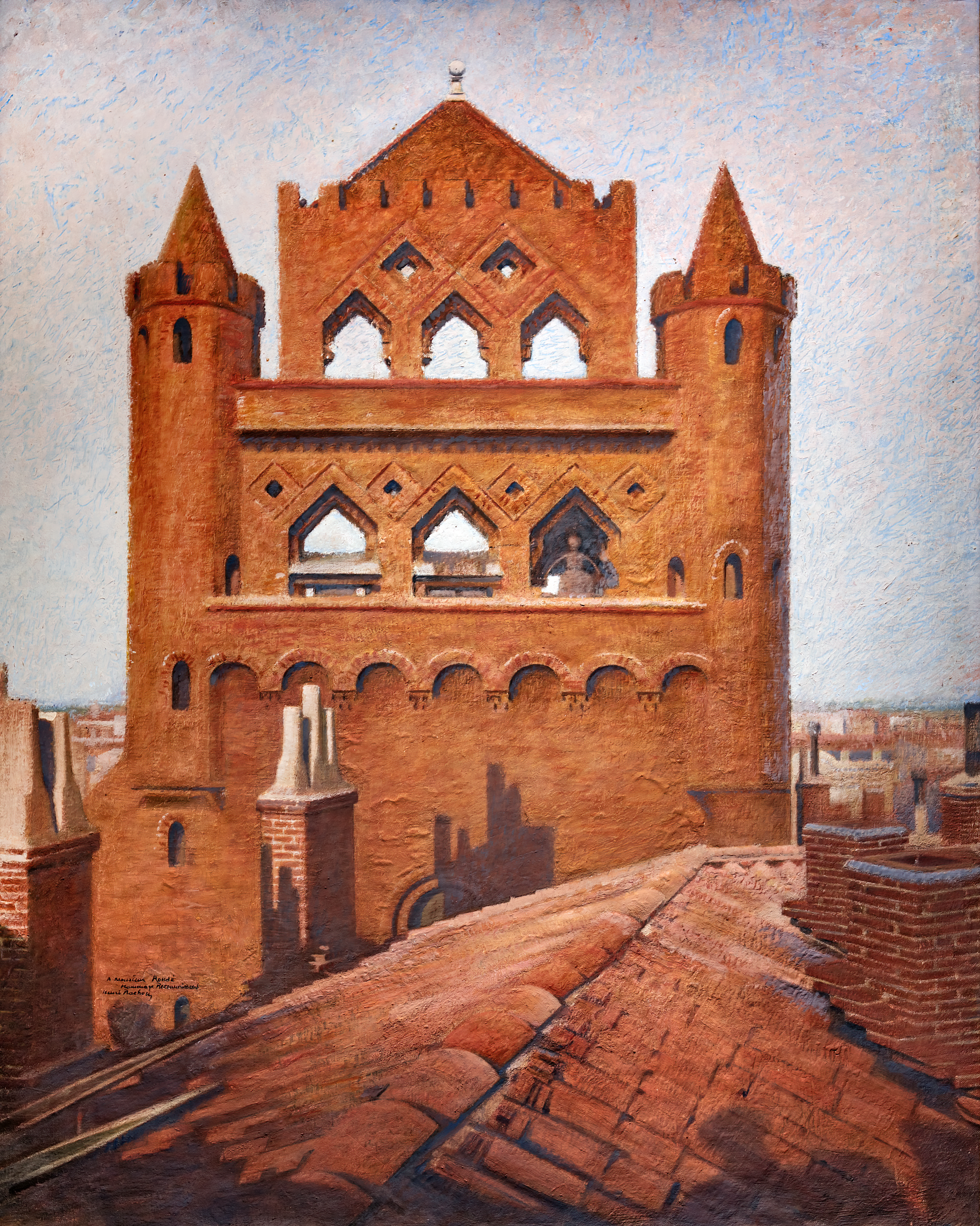
19th-century painting by Henri Rachou

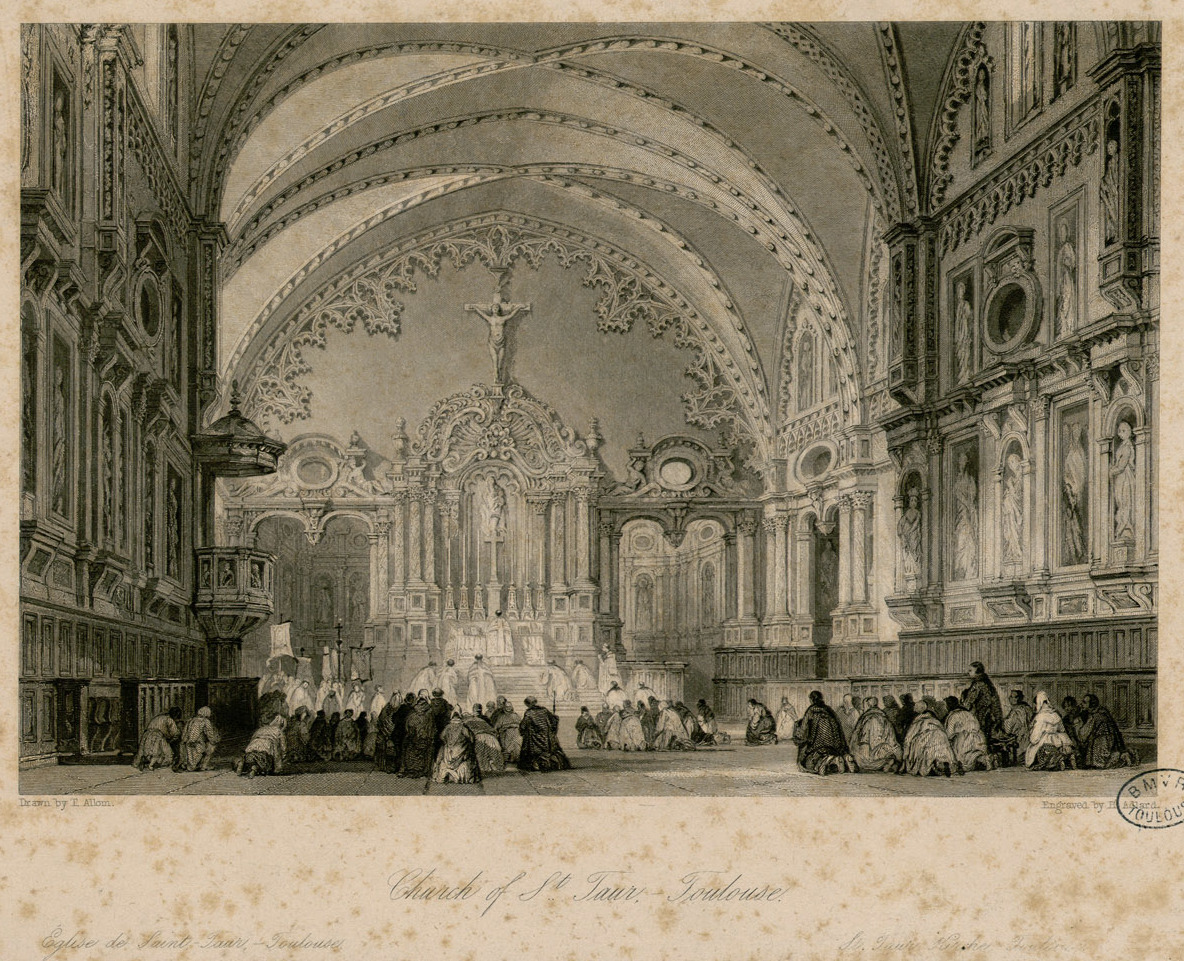
Interior, by Thomas Allom.

== Building ==
The building is constructed of pinkish brick in the Southern French Gothic style, by choice more modest and less ornate than Northern Gothic. The facade takes the form known in the region as a clocher-mur, bell tower wall, and served as the model for many country churches in the area. Each end of the facade is topped with a small hexagonal tower, while across the upper level between the towers runs a row of crenelations.

The interior comprises a single aisle under a ribbed vault. This ends at a transept which opens into two apsidal chapels at the east end of the church. A pietà is located in the north chapel, and a statue of Saint Anne, mother of the Virgin Mary in the south chapel. The wooden statue of Mary, Notre Dame, from which the church took its name, is displayed in the centre of the apse where it is immediately visible as one enters the church.

== Decoration ==
Above the altar in the south chapel can be seen a painting by the 19th-century Toulouse artist Bernard Bénézet, the martyrdom of Saint Saturnin and the Glorification of the Virgin. In the north chapel, a Death of Saint Joseph is by the same artist. On the north wall of the nave another 19th-century painting representing the martyrdom of Saturninus is the work of Jean-Louis Bézard, while a 14th-century painting of the genealogy of Saint Joseph in 38 figures survives on the south wall. The wrought iron altar rail dates from 1778.

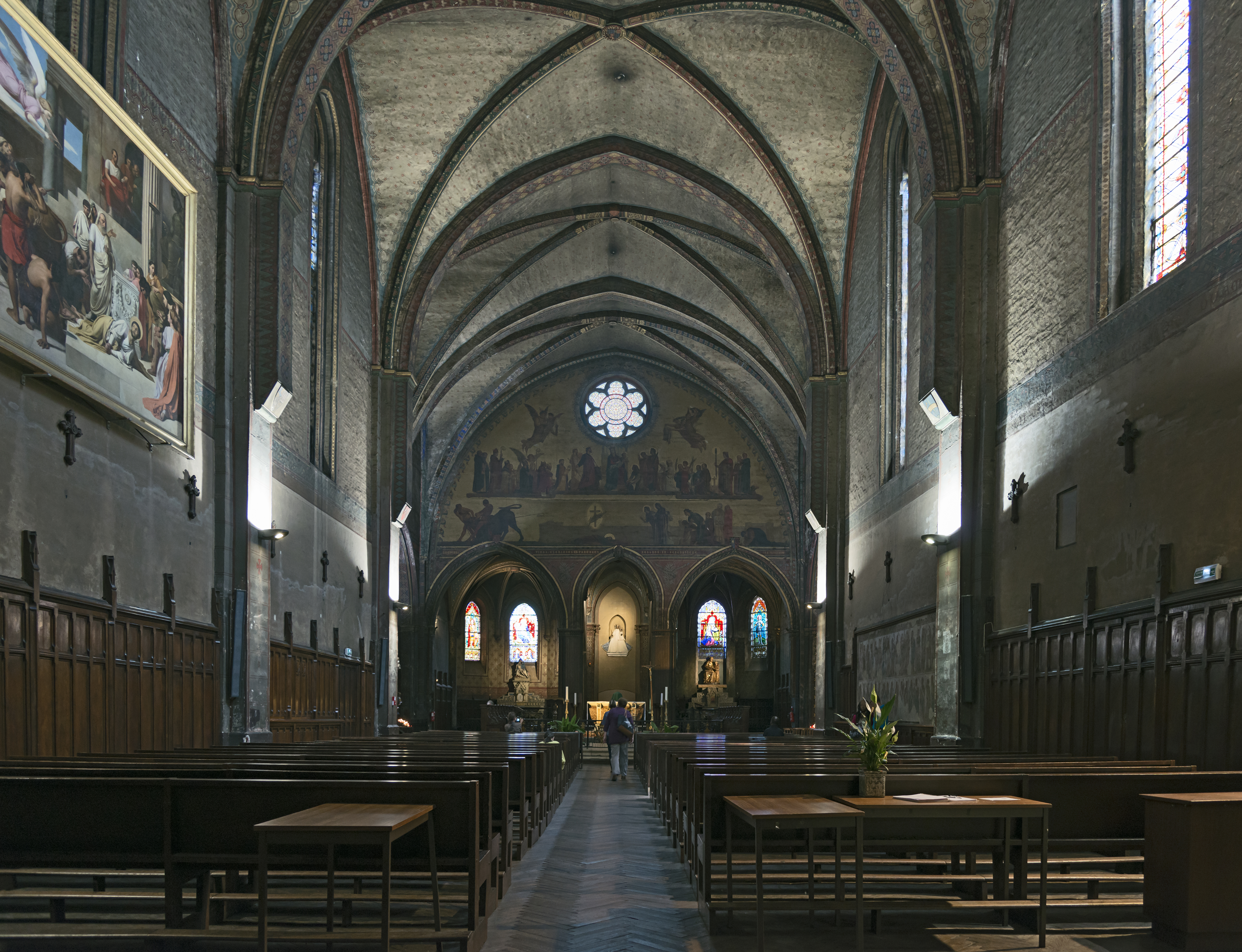
Interior

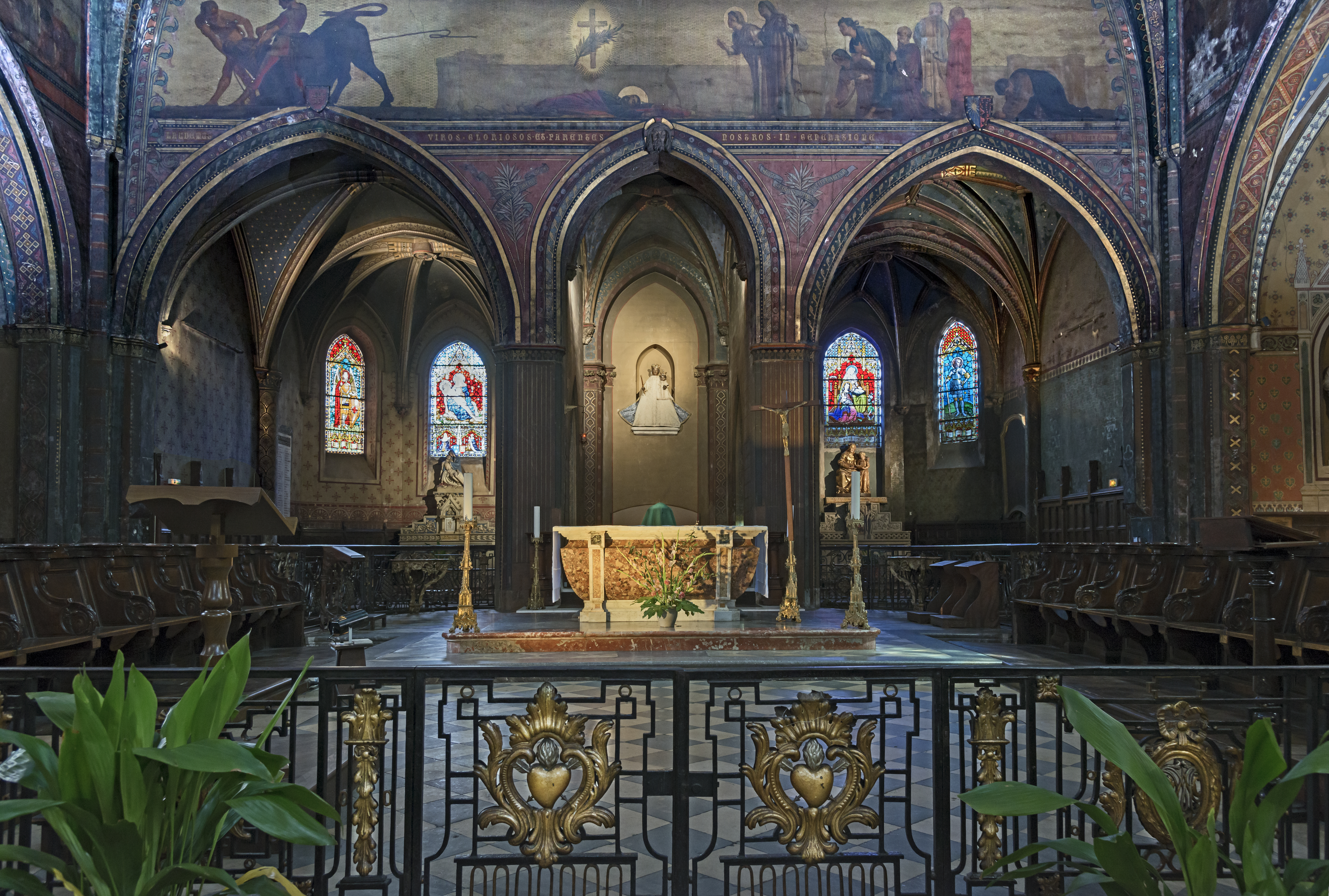
Altar rail

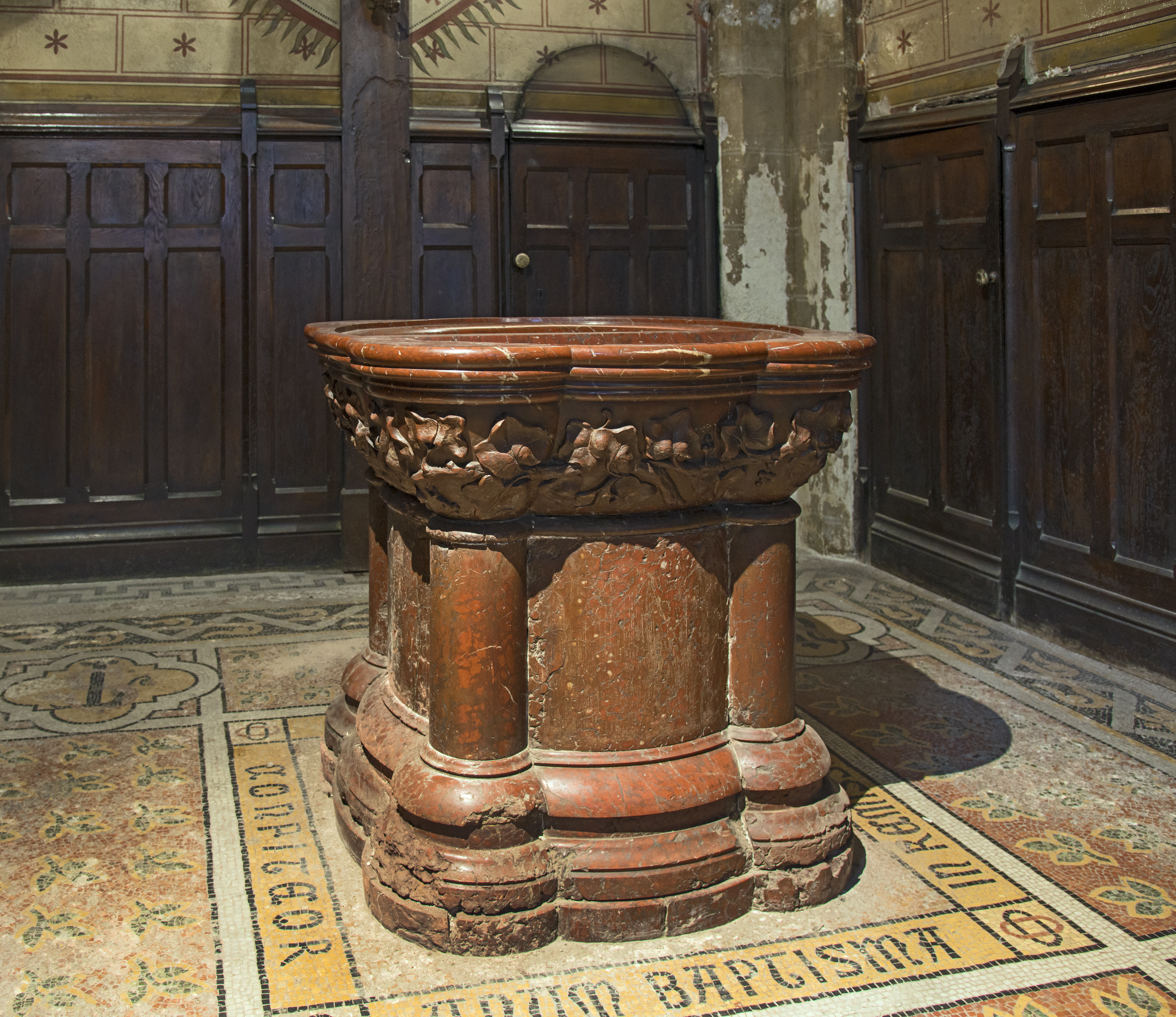
Baptismal font

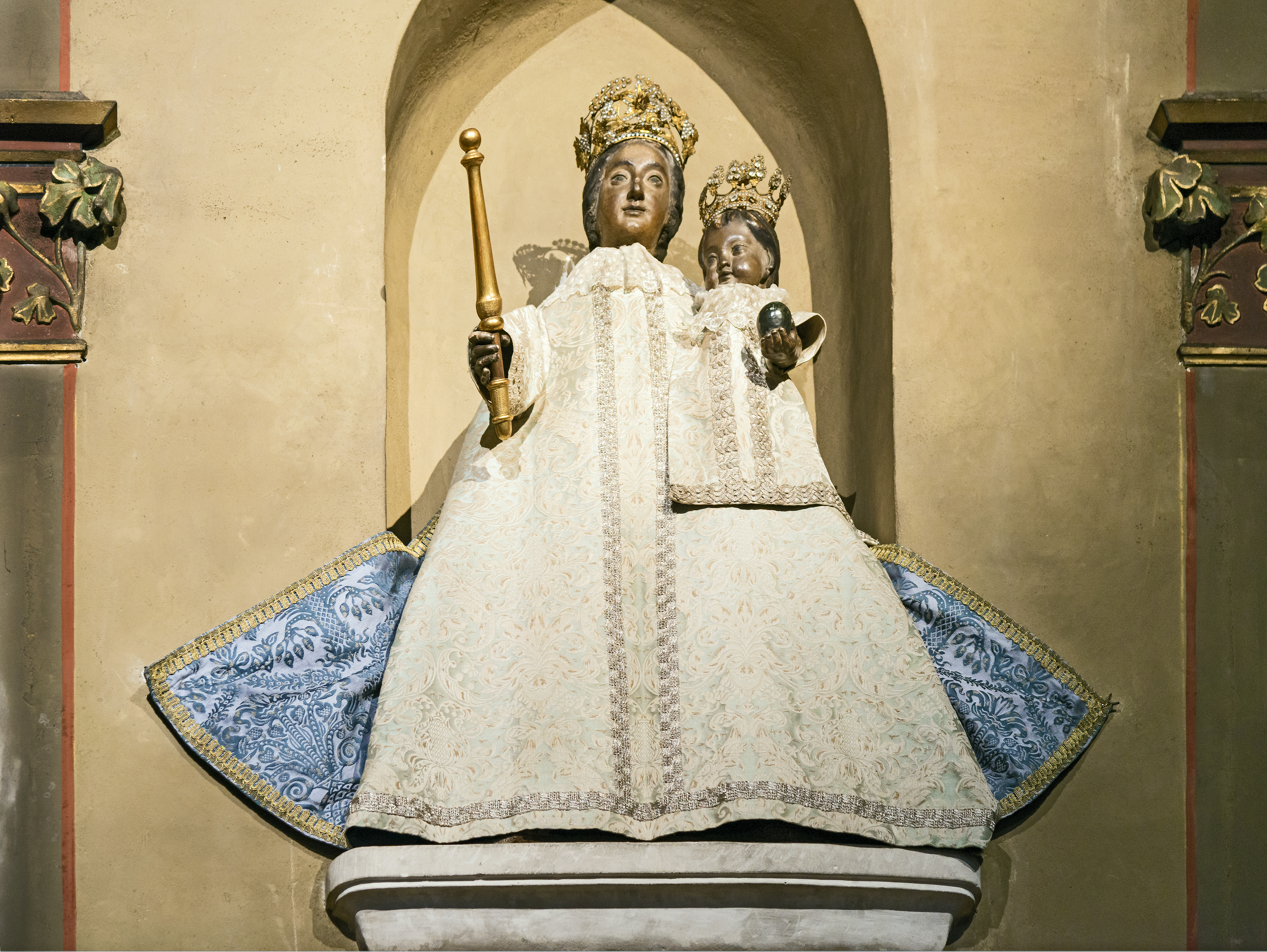
Notre-Dame du Rempart

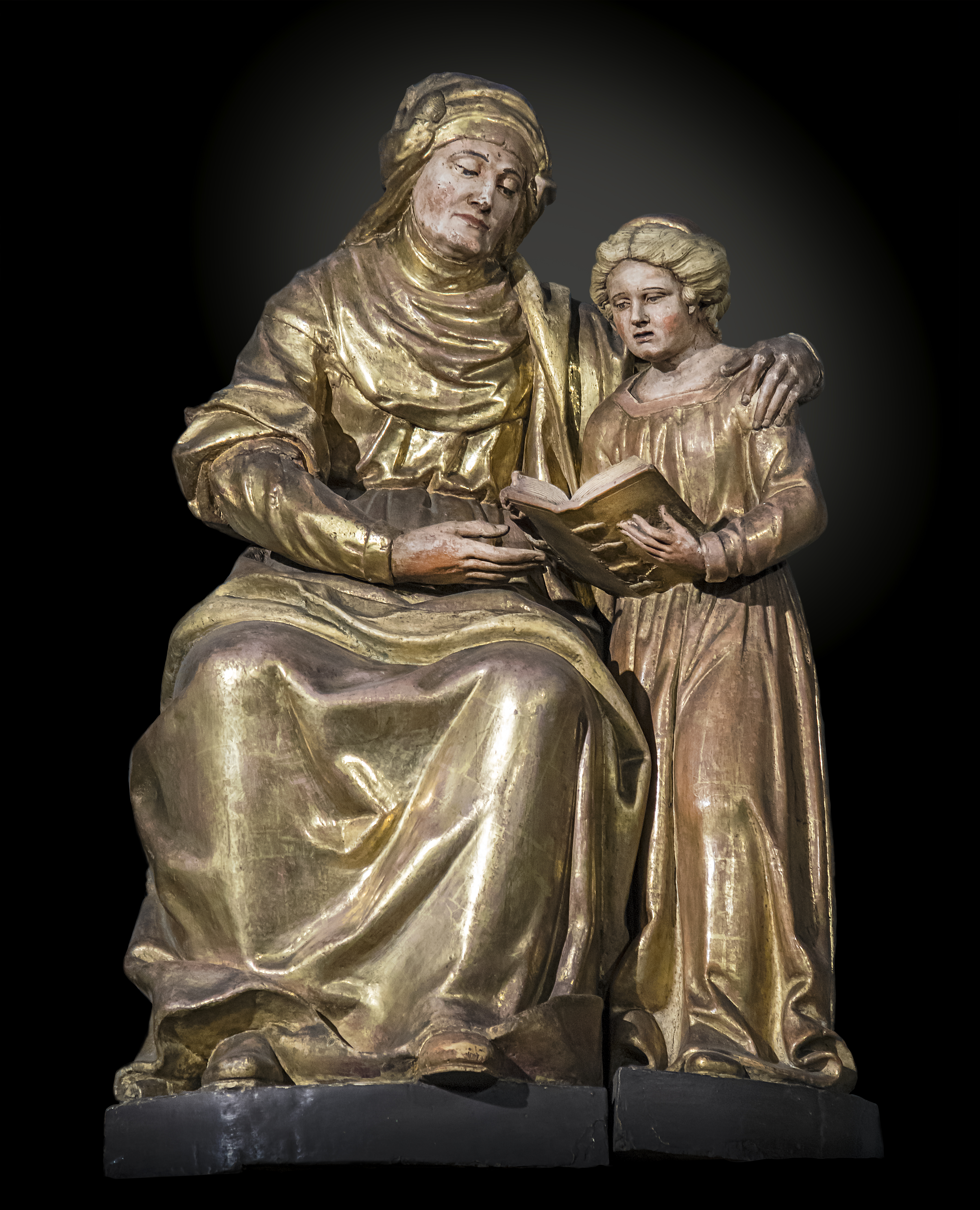
The education of the Virgin by Artus Legoust

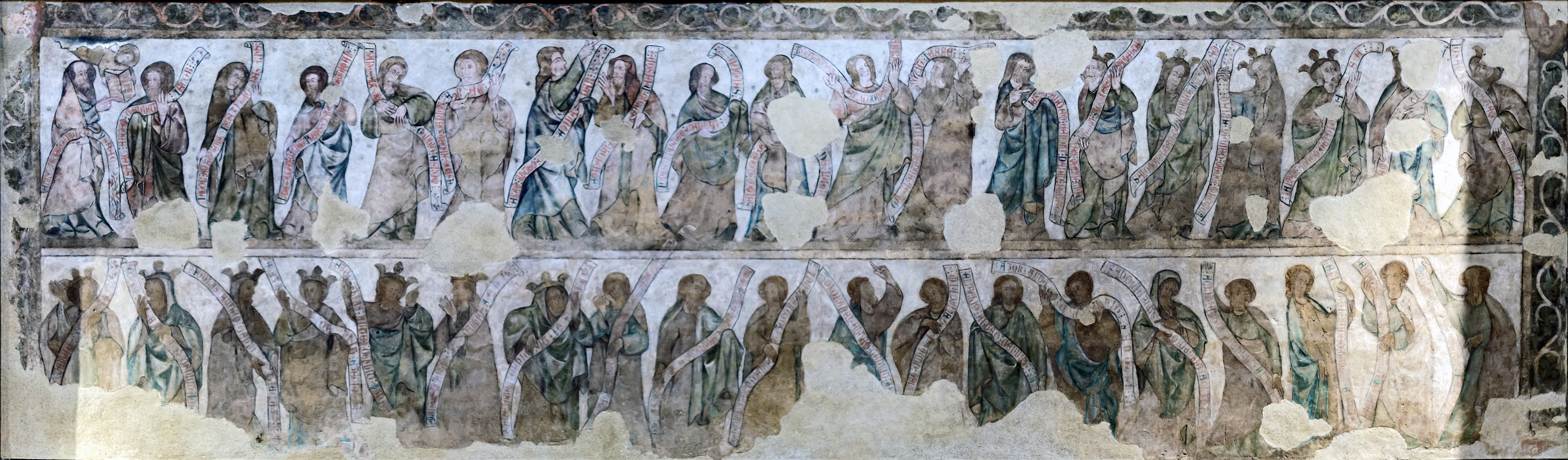
The genealogy of Jacob , 14th-century fresco

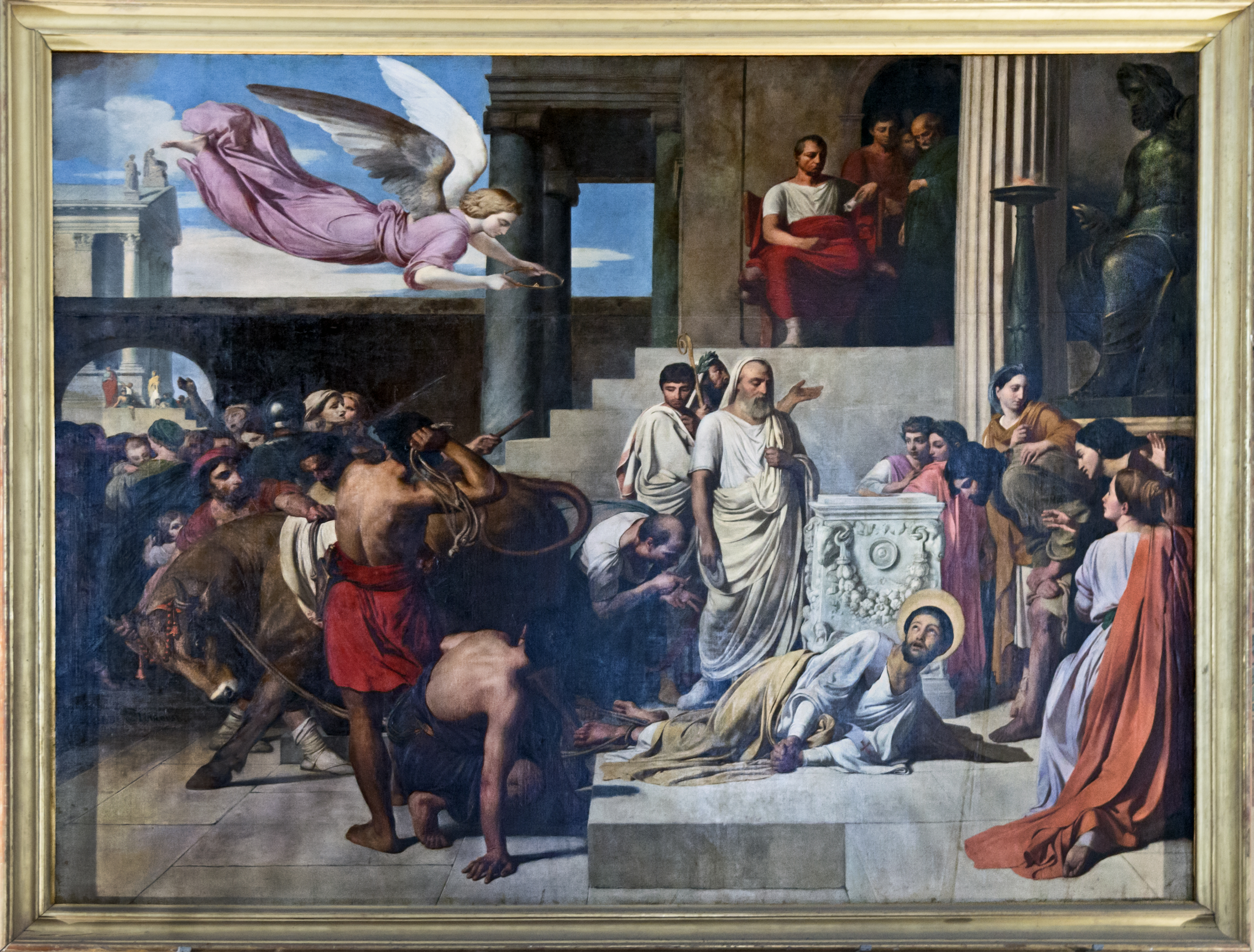
"The martyrdom of Saint Saturnin", by Jean-Louis Bézard

== Organ ==
When it was built, the organ of Notre-Dame du Taur was considered "le plus novateur et le plus riche des orgues de Toulouse, mais aussi de tout le Sud de la France" (transl. the most innovative and the richest of the organs of Toulouse but also of the whole South of France). It was built in 1880 by Eugène Puget, and has been classified as a historical monument since September 25, 1987. Recitals of the festival of Toulouse les Orgues take place there frequently.

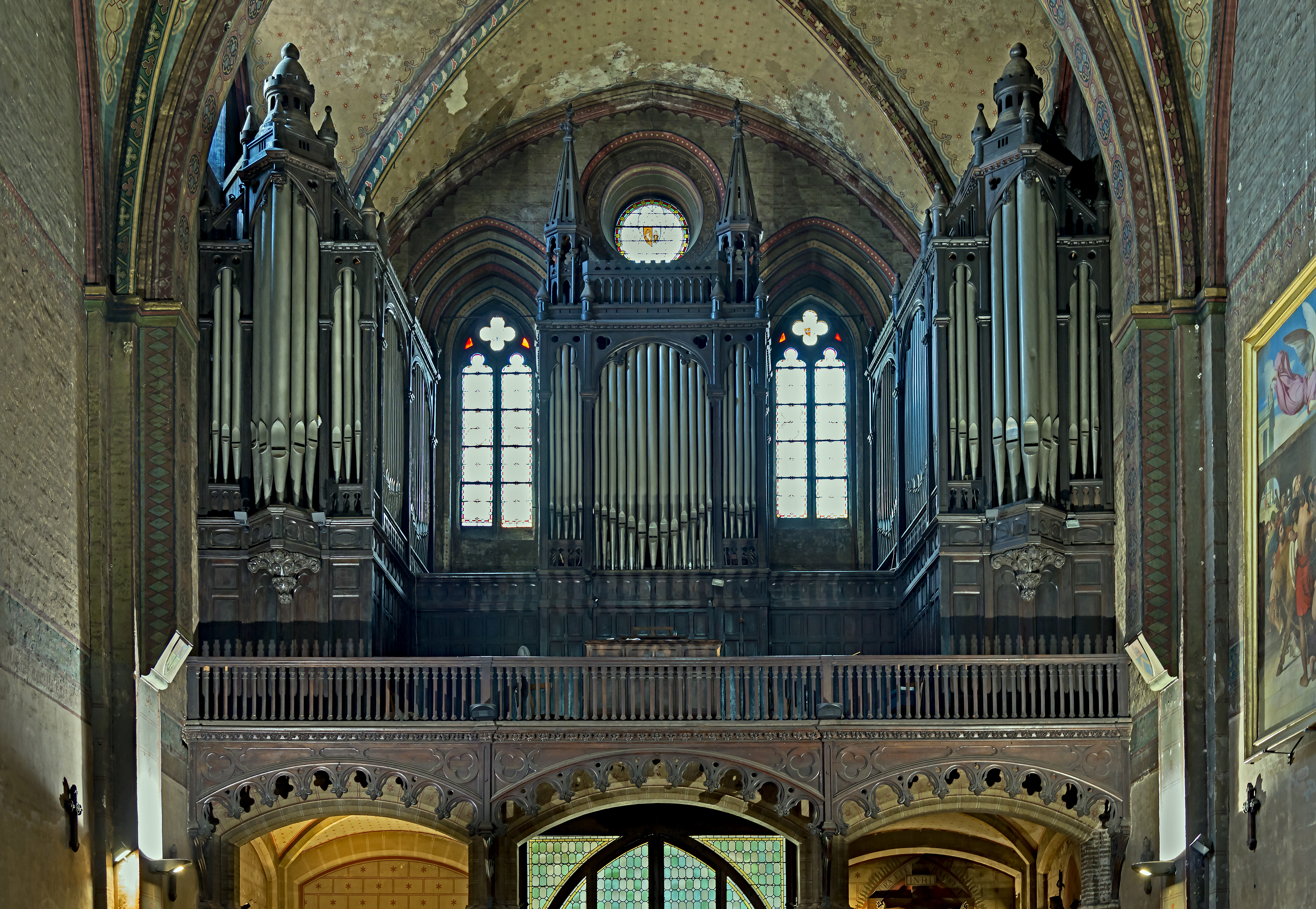
Gallery organ

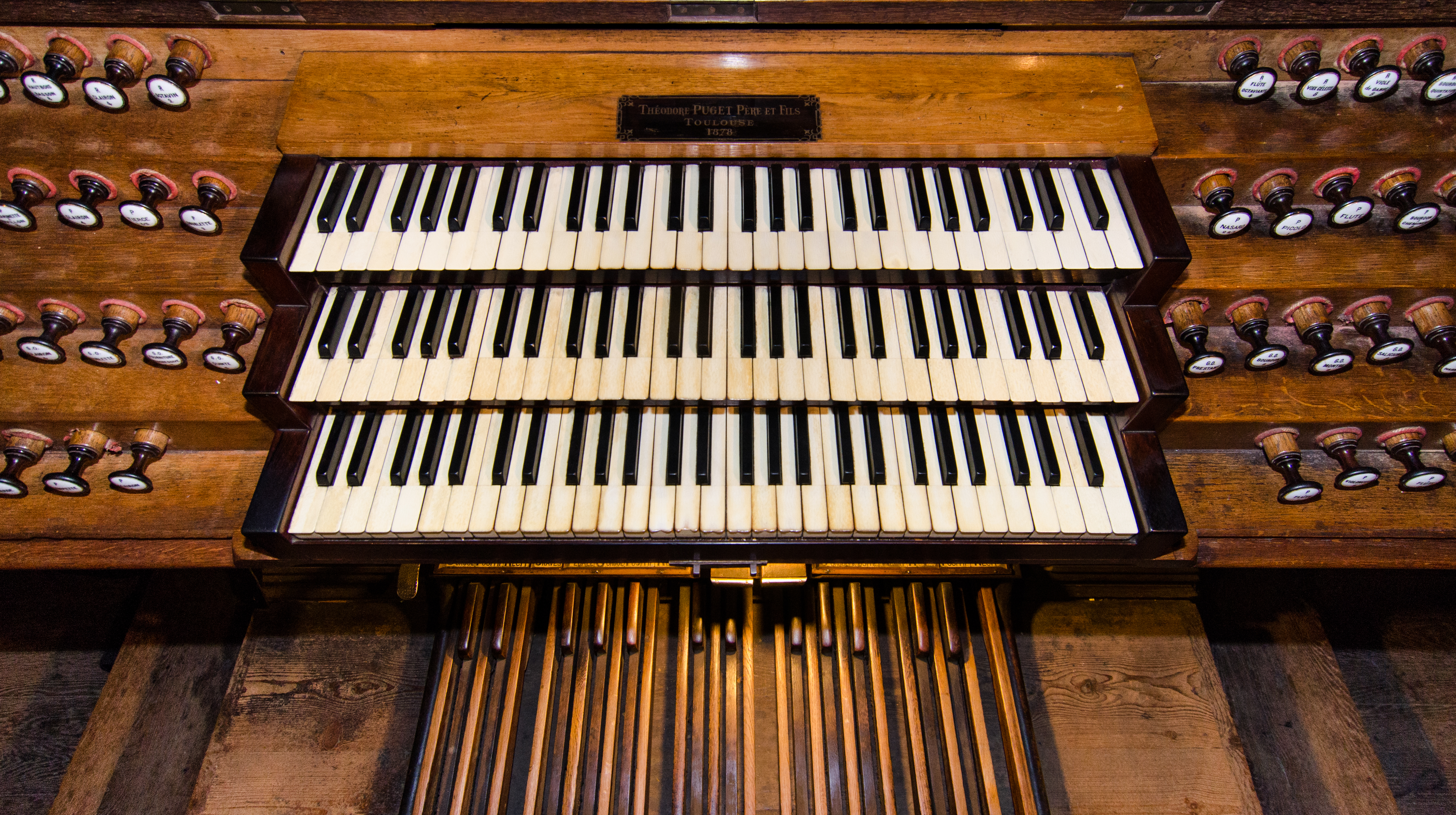
Keyboard of the gallery organ.

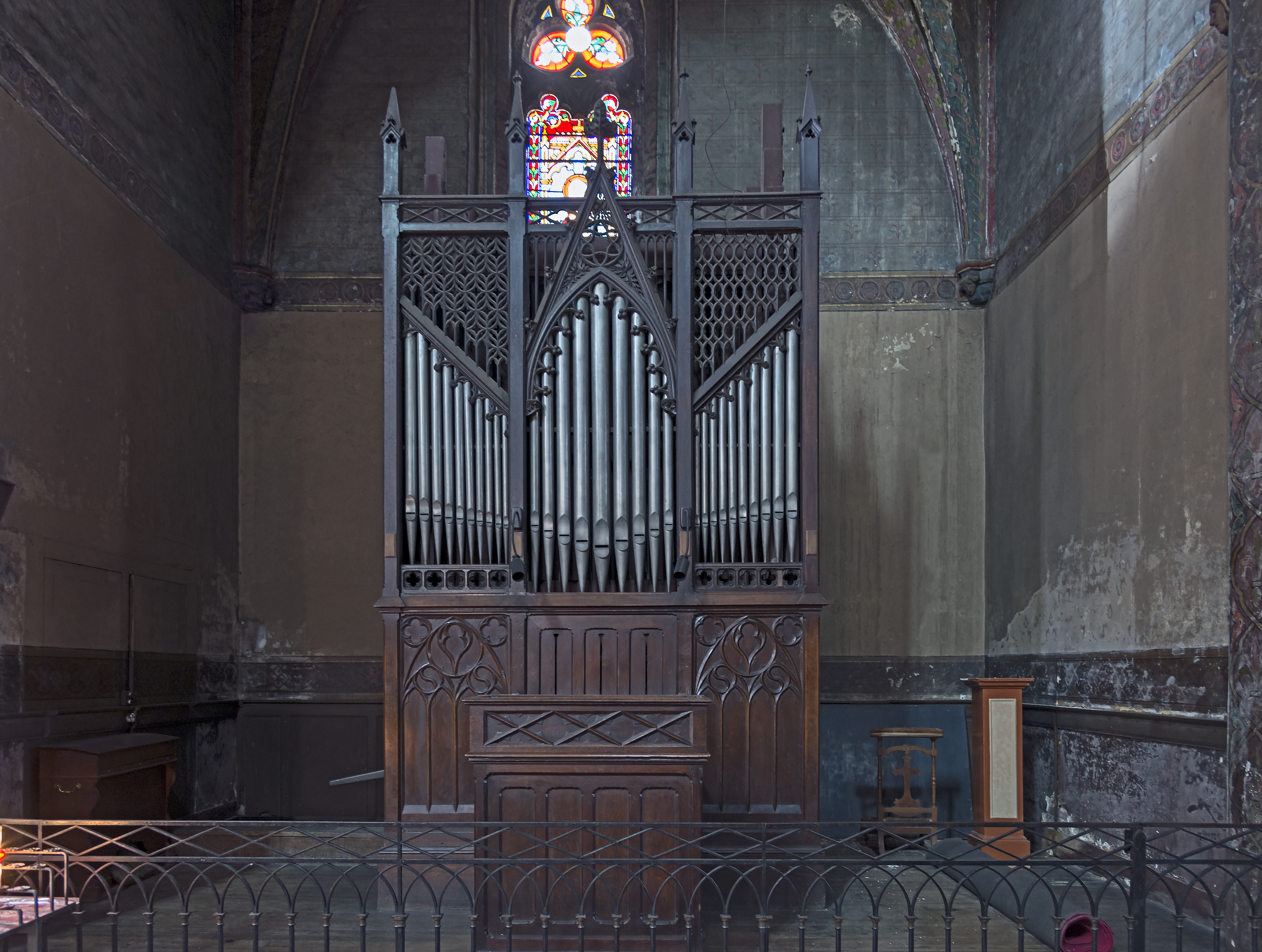
Choir organ.
