= Pierre Affre =

French sculptor

- Born: 1590; Béziers, France
- Died: 1669 (aged 78–79)
- Occupation: Sculptor
- Spouses: Jeanne Alby; Isabeau Laureaux
- Children: 15

Pierre Affre (1590–1669) was a French sculptor.

== Early life ==
Pierre Affre was born in 1590 in Béziers, France. He moved to Toulouse, where he was mentored by Artus Legoust.

== Career ==
Affre was a sculptor in Toulouse. He first worked with architect Claude Pacot, with whom he restored a statue of Clémence Isaure on the Capitole de Toulouse. He subsequently worked with architect Jacques Portes. Later, he worked with stone carver Jacques Mercier, followed by plasterer Jacques Mouret and joiner Jacques Blanc. He also designed two busts with goldsmiths Antoine Guillermy and Bertrand Lacère.

== Personal life ==
Affre was married twice. He married Jeanne Alby in 1632; they had six children. In 1645, he married Isabeau Laureaux, and they had nine children.

== Death ==
Affre died in 1669.
