= Pierre Levesville =

French architect

Pierre Levesville (c. 1570 in Orléans – 1632 in Toulouse) was a 17th-century French architect.

He was the son of a master mason from Orléans. His brother, Jean Levesville, was also a master mason as well as his nephew, Simon Levesville.

== Biography ==
His father worked with his brother, Jehan or Jean Levesville, on the reconstruction of the choir and then the transept of the Cathédrale Sainte-Croix d'Orléans. It was on this site that he did his apprenticeship.

Having made an engraving of Rome kept in the print room of the Bibliothèque nationale de France, circa 1595-1600, signed Petrus Levesville Aurelianensis Inventor Romae, it is assumed he went to Italy for further training.

In 1599, the manufacture of the Basilique-cathédrale Notre-Dame-et-Saint-Privat de Mende signed a contract with Jean Despeysses to rebuild it following the demolitions by the Protestant troops of captain Merle in 1579. It seems that this one did not give entirely satisfaction, so the persons in charge of the reconstruction asked Levesville, who has just arrived from Orléans, to take in charge part of this task at a sales quote with the assent of the bishop.

On 20 January 1603, he married in Mende. He did some work at the Consular House and à un pont rompeu qui s'en allait en ruine.

In 1604 he was entrusted with the construction of the cathedral gallery.

Instead of a rose, Jean Despeysses was accused of having made "a big hole without shape" where it was "impossible to put any glass [...] because of its deformity". Levesville therefore signed a contract in 1608 to rebuild the western rose. The consecration of the cathedral took place in 1620.

He subsequently did some works for the Cathédrale Saint-Pierre de Saint-Flour.

During the night of 9 to 10 December 1609, a fire ravaged the Gothic choir of the Cathédrale Saint-Étienne de Toulouse.

In 1610, he hired Jean Tardieu, master mason in Saint-Alban, by contract with the notary Parrouton. At that time, he worked on the bridges of Lavoûte-Chilhac, Massiac, Saint-Germain-Lembron and the terrasse of the château de Murat. He directed the works of the Église Saint-Léger de Cheylade since the 11 May (completed in 1614 by Jean Tardieu).

Levesville came to Toulouse in 1610. No master mason contacted by the chapter wanted to deal with this contract. Levesville was the only one to accept it for the sum of 45,000 French livres in addition to the materials to be provided by the Chapter. All work was completed on 23 July 1614.

The success of this work of restoration of the Toulouse cathedral earned him to be called as expert on 24 November 1614 by the Judge Mage of the Présidial of Nîmes to give his opinion on the work carried out at the Cathédrale Notre-Dame-et-Saint-Castor de Nîmes. After receiving the report of the appointed experts and having received 360 livres for his session, Levesville left Nîmes on 3 January 1615 for Toulouse, where he had to complete the work he had been doing at the arsenal of the Hôtel-de-ville, for the extension of the altarpiece of the Saint-Étienne cathedral, and the construction of a house for Anne de Cadilhac.

In 1613 he was consulted on a lease for the restoration of the church of Feuillants of Labastide-Clermont.

Following a house fire around a square (now National Square) in 1614, the consuls of Montauban asked him for a reconstruction project. The work lasted until 1621. A new fire occurred on 15 June 1649 requiring new work. They were entrusted to the Toulouse architect Claude Pacot, asking him to respect the facades already built by Levesville.

The consuls of the city of Montauban and Levesville signed a contract in 1615 to build the Temple Neuf. 13 m high, it was in the shape of a brick rotunda with a panelled vault and surmounted by a cupola. It was completed in 1617 but was demolished following a royal ruling dated 29 October 1664.

On 26 January 1615, the regents of the Confraternity of the Rosary entrusted him with the contract of desmolir et réédiffier la chapelle de Notre Dame du Rozairx and parfaicte… par tout le moys de juin prochain the Church of the Jacobins.

On 22 September 1617, Levesville was chosen preferably by Marcel Le Roy, a Parisian architect, to build the vaults of the choir of the Cathédrale Sainte-Marie d'Auch. The work lasted until August 1620. At the end of the work, two architects, Géraud of Spain and Audibert Cousteau, proceeded to the control of the good end of the works before the fabriciens pay him the 75,000 livres agreed to the contract.

He worked on the construction of new buildings for the château de Lavardens for the lord of Roquelaure in 1620. Some historians believe that he might also be one of the authors of the château du Rieutort at Roquelaure, built for the same, erected from 1619 because his signature can be seen as a witness on a contract.

In 1622, he was called by the Confrérie royale des Pénitents Bleus to build their chapel, modern Église Saint-Jérôme de Toulouse.

After the peace of Montpellier, in 1625, the king had a new cathedral built in Montpellier at the request of Bishop Pierre de Fenouillet of Montpellier (1607-1652). A commission of architects was appointed including Levesville and submitted its report. Levesville was accompanied by his nephew Simon Levesville. Construction of the foundations began but was abandoned in 1629, on the orders of cardinal Richelieu wjho asked for the restoration of the Cathédrale Saint-Pierre de Montpellier. These unfinished foundations are still visible place de la Canourgue.

In February 1627, he gave the plans and models of the convent of the nuns of Saint John of Jerusalem or of Malta, installed in the Saint-Cyprien suburb.

== Bibliography ==
- Georges Costa, Pierre Levesville. L'œuvre d'un architecte orléanais dans le Midi de la France pendant le premier tiers du XVII, p. 313-318, in Archéologie. Volume II, 96e Congrès des Sociétés Savantes tenu à Toulouse en 1971
- Hélène Rousteau-Chambon, Le gothique des Temps modernes. Architecture religieuse en milieu urbain, Éditions A. et J. Picard, Paris, 2003 ISBN 2-7084-0692-2
- Georges Costa, La chapelle Notre-Dame du Rosaire aux Jacobins de Toulouse, une œuvre de Pierre Levesville, p. 165-177, in Mémoires de la Société archéologique du Midi de la France, 2004, volume 64 Read online

== See also ==
Saint-Jérôme Church in Toulouse
