= Jacques de Saint-Blanquat =

French Roman Catholic bishop (born 1925)

His Excellency Jacques de Saint-Blanquat
- Bishop Emeritus of Roman Catholic Diocese of Montauban
- Appointed: 5 August 1975
- Term ended: 18 November 1995
- Predecessor: Roger Tort
- Successor: Bernard Housset
- Previous post: Vicar General of Montauban (1968–1975)

Orders
- Ordination: 29 March 1952
- Consecration: 5 October 1975 by Louis-Jean Guyot

Personal details
- Born: Jacques Marie Sébastien de Saint-Blanquat; 21 November 1925 (age 100) Toulouse, France
- Education: Catholic Institute of Toulouse

Jacques Marie Sébastien de Saint-Blanquat (born 21 November 1925) is a French Roman Catholic prelate who served as the diocesan bishop of Diocese of Montauban from 1975 until his resignation in 1995.

== Biography ==
De Saint-Blanquat was born in Toulouse and attended the secondary school in his native city with the Fathers of the Society of Jesus, first at the Collège Saint Stanislas and then at Caousou. After a year at the Lycée Pierre de Fermat, he applied to join the White Fathers and completed two years of philosophy at Kerbors in Brittany, followed by a year of novitiate at Maison Carrée in Algeria. But for health reasons, he withdrew the White Fathers and continued his theology studies at the Catholic Institute of Toulouse, where he earned his bachelor's degree.

He was ordained a priest on 29 March 1952 for the Diocese of Montauban and from 1953 to 1958 served as vicar in Verfeil and chaplain to the JAC-JACF (Joint Church of the Catholic Community of Montauban) in the area. In 1958 he was appointed diocesan head of this movement, that followed by his appointment of the chaplain for the movement of the Christians in the Rural World in 1963. From 1968 to 1975, he was a vicar general with special responsibility for the central area of the diocese and Comminges.

On 5 August 1975, he was appointed by Pope Paul VI as Diocesan Bishop of Montauban. He was consecrated a bishop on 5 October 1975 at the Montauban Cathedral by Cardinal Louis-Jean Guyot and resigned on 18 November 1995, and returned to reside to his native Archdiocese of Toulouse.

De Saint-Blanquat was awarded as the Knight of the Legion of Honour by President of France on 10 April 2009.
