= Bouhours (surname) =

Bouhours is a surname. Notable people with the surname include:

- Dominique Bouhours, French literary critic
- Gilles Bouhours (1944–1960), French Marian visionary
- Émile Bouhours, French cyclist
- Samuel Bouhours (born 1987), French professional footballer
