= Musée des Beaux-Arts d'Orléans =

Museum in Orléans, France

Musée des Beaux-Arts
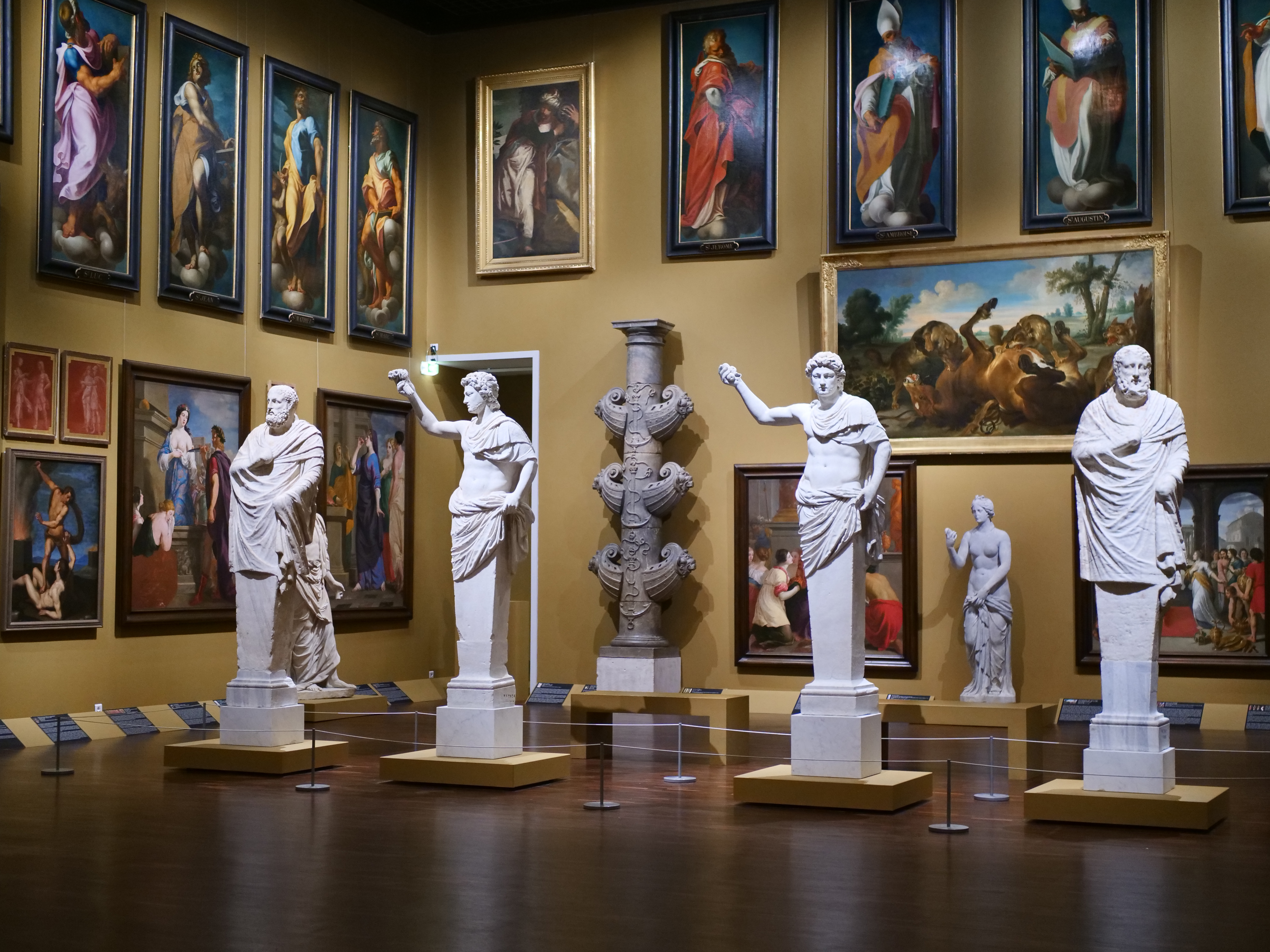
- Inside the museum
- Established: 1797
- Location: 1 rue Fernand Rabier; 45 000 Orléans, France
- Coordinates: 47.9025881°N 1.9095664°E
- Visitors: 51 331 (2012)

The Musée des beaux-arts d'Orléans is a museum in the city of Orléans in the Loiret department and the Centre-Val de Loire region in France.

Founded in 1797, it is one of France's oldest provincial museums. Its collections cover European arts from the 15th to 20th century.

The museum owns circa 2,000 paintings (with works by Correggio, Annibale Carracci, Guido Reni, Sebastiano Ricci, Diego Velázquez, Anthony van Dyck, Antoine Watteau, François Boucher, Hubert Robert, Eugène Delacroix (Head of a Woman), Gustave Courbet, 700 sculptures (Baccio Bandinelli), more than 1,200 pieces of decorative arts, 10,000 drawings, 50,000 prints and the second largest collection of pastels in France after that of the Louvre.

== History ==
The museum was founded during the French Revolution by the initiative of Jean Bardin, director of the school of drawing of the city and of Aignan-Thomas Desfriches, in 1797. The museum was installed in the Palais épiscopal d'Orléans, an ancient college, in 1799. In 1804, the museum was closed and the collections were placed in the Jardin des plantes d'Orléans.

The museum was reopened on 30 December 1823, by the initiative of the count and mayor of Rocheplatte and the count of Bizemont-Prunelé, André Gaspard Parfait, who eventually became the director of the museum. The museum was then installed in l'hôtel des Créneaux.

In 1855, the historical collections were separated from the art collections to form the Musée Historique et Archéologique de l'Orléanais, which moved into the Hotel Cabu. Several donators contributed to the enrichment of the collections of the museum during the 19th century, among which the madame of Limay, the daughter of Aignan-Thomas Desfriches, Eudoxe Marcille, and artists such as Henri de Triqueti and Léon Cogniet.
