= Pierre-Marie Théas =

French Roman Catholic bishop

- Bishop of Tarbes et Lourdes
- Church: Catholic Church
- Diocese: Diocese of Tarbes-et-Lourdes
- In office: 17 February 1947 – 12 February 1970
- Predecessor: Georges Choquet
- Successor: Henri Donze
- Previous posts: Titular Bishop of Sanctus Germanus (1970); Bishop of Montaubaun (1940-1947)

Orders
- Ordination: 26 September 1970
- Consecration: 3 October 1940 by Edmond Vansteenberghe

Personal details
- Born: 14 September 1894 Barzun, Basses-Pyrénées, France
- Died: 3 April 1977 (aged 82)

Pierre-Marie Théas (14 September 1894 – 3 April 1977) was a French Roman Catholic bishop of Montauban and bishop of Tarbes and Lourdes. A significant figure in Catholic resistance to Nazism in France, he was recognised as Righteous among the Nations by Yad Vashem for his efforts to protect Jews from the Nazi Holocaust.

== Biography ==
Pierre-Marie Théas was born on 14 September 1894 in Barzun, Pyrénées-Atlantiques. He was ordained as a priest on 16 September 1920 and was consecrated as the bishop of Montauban on 26 July 1940.

In 1940 he was present at the last days of the former Spanish president Manuel Azaña, and offered support to his widow.

=== Resistance to Nazism ===
When the Archbishop of Toulouse, Jules-Géraud Saliège, led a powerful denunciation of the mistreatment of Jews in 1942, Théas joined other French bishops in denouncing the roundup of Jews for deportation to Nazi death camps. He wrote a pastoral letter condemning the Nazi deportation of Jews in the summer of 1942 in which he said: "I give voice to the outraged protest of Christian conscience and I proclaim… that all men, whatever their race or religion, have the right to be respected by individuals and by states." For his attempts to prevent the Jewish deportations and persecutions he was later honoured as "Righteous Among The Nations" by Yad Vashem.

The protest of the bishops is seen by various historians as a turning point in the formerly passive response of the Catholic Church in France. Marie-Rose Gineste transported a pastoral letter from Bishop Théas of Montauban by bicycle to forty parishes, denouncing the uprooting of men and women "treated as wild animals", and the French Resistance smuggled the text to London, where it was broadcast to France by the Radio Londres service of the BBC, reaching tens of thousands of homes.

Théas continued to oppose the Nazi policies culminating in a fiery sermon in his cathedral in 1944 in which he condemned the "Cruel and inhuman treatment of one of our fellow men". He was arrested the night after the sermon by the Gestapo. He was sent to a concentration camp where he spent ten weeks and then was released and returned to his parish.

=== Post-war ===
After the war, in March 1945, he became the first president of the movement for reconciliation and peace named Pax Christi. The group, initiated by Marthe Dortel Chaudot, aimed at first mainly at the reconciliation between France and Germany, but in 1952 it was recognized by Pope Pius XII as an official Catholic Peace Movement.

On 17 February 1947 he was appointed the bishop of Tarbes and Lourdes by Pope Pius XII, and retired on 12 February 1970. On retirement he was appointed to the titular see of Sanctus Germanus, from which he resigned later in the same year.

He was noted for his belief in Liberation Theology. He has been credited as saying:

"Urged on by unrestrainable forces, today's world asks for a revolution. The revolution must succeed, but it can succeed only if the Church enters the fray, bringing the Gospel. After being liberated from Nazi dictatorship, we want to liberate the working class from capitalist slavery."

He died on 3 April 1977.

=== Apparition of Espis ===
Espis is a hamlet, north of Moissac (France) in the department of Tarn-et-Garonne in the diocese of Montauban. In this place there were three children - and soon after a 40-year-old man - who claimed to have seen the Virgin Mary in 1946. On 4 May 1947 the bishop promulgated his negative judgment official, threatening to suspend "a divinis" any priest who celebrated Mass in Espis. In this condemnation, the little Gilles Bouhours (he too was a marian seer) will also be involved, although he was not named in the decree of Pierre-Marie Théas. Indeed the official sentence of Pierre-Marie Théas against the 4 alleged visionaries of Espis dated back to 4 May 1947, while Gilles himself did not visit Espis until 13 October that year, therefore the bishop's decision on the authenticity of the alleged apparitions, did not in any way concern the apparitions of Gilles.

== Works ==
- Ce Que Croyait Bernadette (The Faith of Bernadette)
- Ce Que Croyait Le Vierge Marie (The Faith of the Virgin Mary).
- Only Through These Hands translated into English by Geraldine Carrigan
