= Orphan Girl at the Cemetery =

Painting by Delacroix

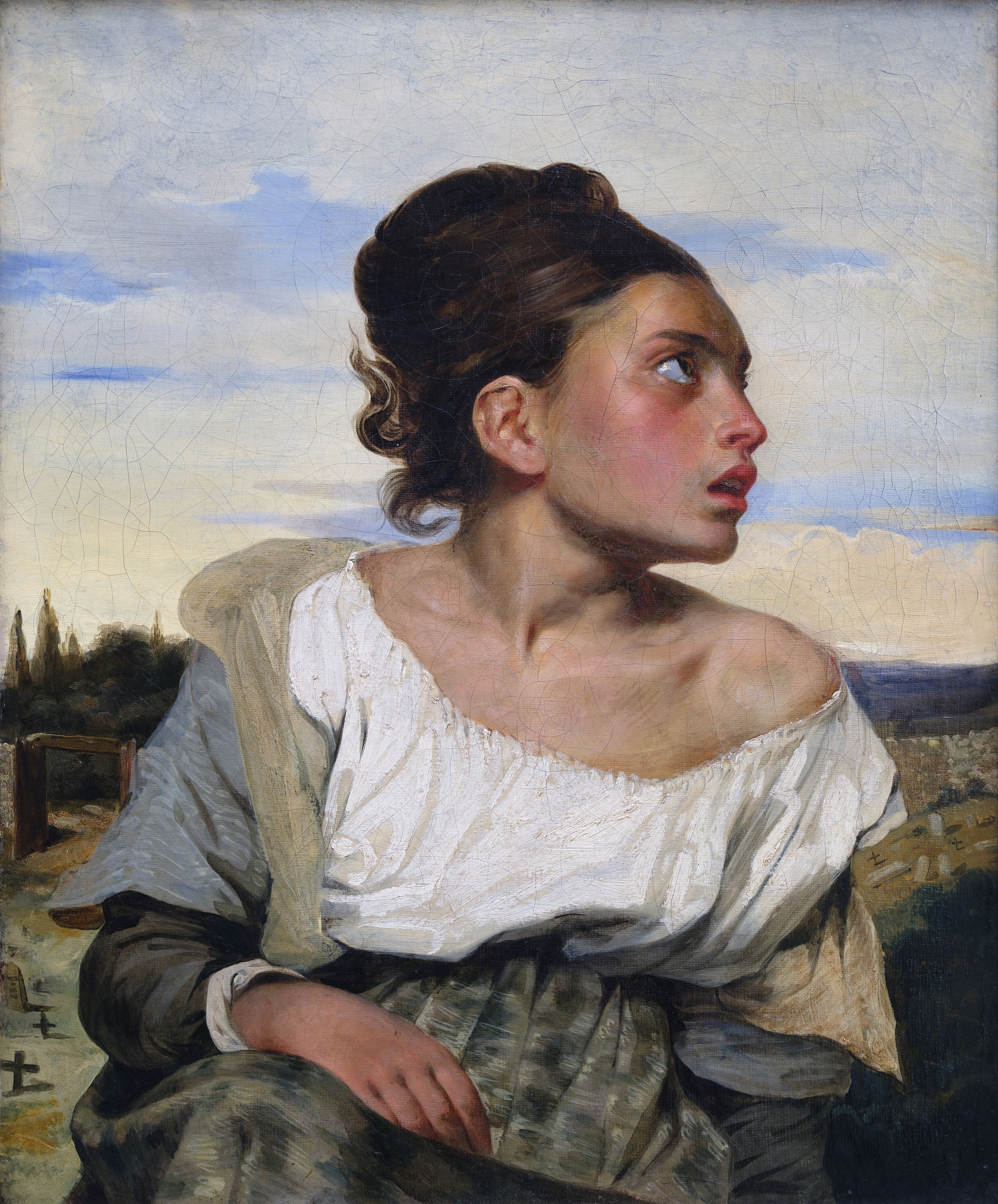
- Artist: Eugène Delacroix
- Year: circa 1823–1824
- Medium: Oil on canvas
- Dimensions: 66 cm × 54 cm (26 in × 21 in)
- Location: Musée du Louvre, Paris

The Orphan Girl at the cemetery (also known as Young Orphan Girl in the Cemetery; French: Jeune orpheline au cimetière) (c. 1823 or 1824) is a painting by the French artist Eugène Delacroix.

== History ==
Believed to be a preparatory work in oil for the artist's later Massacre at Chios, Orphan Girl at the Cemetery is nevertheless considered a masterpiece in its own right. An air of sorrow and fearfulness emanates from the picture, and tears well from the eyes of the grief-stricken girl as she looks apprehensively upward. The dimness of the sky and the abandoned laying-ground are consonant with her expression of melancholy. The girl's body language and clothing evoke tragedy and vulnerability: the dress drooping down from her shoulder, a hand laid weakly on her thigh, the shadows above the nape of her neck, the darkness at her left side, and the cold and pale coloring of her attire. All these are combined to emphasize a sense of loss, of unreachable hope, her isolation, and the absence of any means of help.

For Delacroix, colors were the most important ingredients for his paintings. Because of this artistic taste and belief, he did not have the patience to create facsimiles of classical statues. He revered Peter Paul Rubens and the Venetians. He chose the use of colorful hues and exotic themes for his paintings, drawing inspiration from other inspirational places, resulting in works described as glossy and abundant with movement.

== Provenance ==
The Young Orphan Girl in the Cemetery, an alternate title for the painting, is currently in the Musée du Louvre in Paris, France.
