= Gilles Bouhours =

French Marian visionary (1944–1960)

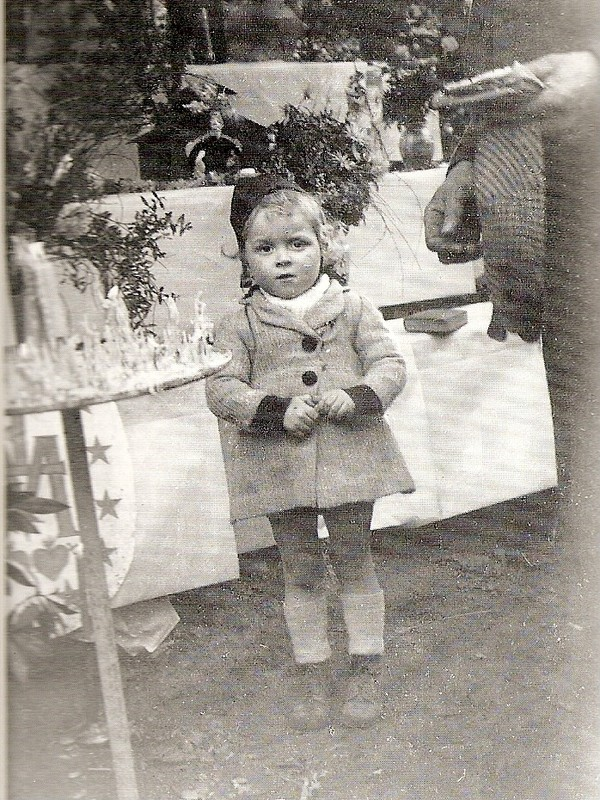
- Born: 27 November 1944; Bergerac, France
- Died: 26 February 1960 (aged 15); Seilhan, France
- Known for: Visionary of Mary, mother of Jesus

Gilles Bouhours (27 November 1944 – 26 February 1960) was a Marian visionary from France.

Bouhours is known for his private meeting with Pope Pius XII on 1 May 1950, wherein he gave the pope a purported message from Mary, mother of Jesus on the dogma of the Assumption of Mary. It is said that the pope asked God, during the Holy Year of 1950, for a sign that could reassure him that the dogma of the Assumption was actually God's will. When Bouhours gave the message to Pius XII, the pope considered it the hoped-for sign. Six months after their private meeting, the pope proclaimed the dogma of the Assumption by publishing Munificentissimus Deus.

== Early life ==
Gilles Bouhours was born on 27 November 1944, into a family from Mayenne, France. His father was the plumber Gabriel Bouhours (b. 1913), his mother Madeleine (b. 1911) was a housewife, and Gilles was the third of five children.

At the age of nine months Bouhours was diagnosed with meningoencephalitis (meningitis with encephalitis), a disease which was often fatal at the time, because there were no effective medicines nor treatments to combat it. For this reason, a family friend and nun of the Little Sisters of the Poor gave Bouhours' parents two images of saints with relics to place under his pillow; one was a holy card with a relic of Saint Therese of the Child Jesus, and the other image was of a missionary. Three nights passed without any improvement in Bouhours' health, but on the fourth night his parents found him healed, breathing normally and without a fever.

== Beginning of apparitions ==
In 1947, Bouhours and his family lived in Arcachon, France. He was two years old and was similar to his peers. On 30 September 1947, Bouhours claimed to have had a vision of Mary, which was later followed by many others. In one of these visions, he reported that the Virgin Mary asked him to go to Espis, north of Moissac in the department of Tarn-et-Garonne, in the Diocese of Montauban. In the area were three children – and soon after a 40-year-old man – who claimed to have seen the Virgin Mary in 1946. These alleged seers were immediately investigated by the diocese. On 12 December 1946, the local bishop, Pierre-Marie Théas, had disclosed his opinion concerning their alleged apparitions in a private letter, deeming them false and therefore unworthy of faith. His judgment only concerned the alleged seers of Espis and not Gilles, who was not subject to the investigation at the time, despite becoming involved in the affair and associated with the alleged visionaries soon after.

Six months later on 4 May 1947, the bishop publicized his official judgment, threatening to suspend a divinis any priest who celebrated Mass in Espis. During this period, Gilles claimed Mary confirmed he had to observe the bishop's decision by not participating in any Mass in Espis. Gilles did not visit Espis until 13 October that year, therefore the bishop's decision did not apply to the boy's visions at all.

When Théas left the diocese, Louis de Courrèges d'Ustou [fr] took over, and on 1 February 1950 he set up a new commission to evaluate the alleged visionaries. His conclusion was that the visions were nothing more than autosuggestions and hallucinations, excluding any supernatural origin. Although Gilles had not been counted among the alleged seers of Espis affected by the decree of the local bishop, he was nonetheless involved in the affair. Such accusations greatly prevented Gilles from obtaining a private audience with Pius XII.

== Message for Pius XII ==
On 13 December 1948 Gilles reported that the Virgin Mary had confided to him a secret reserved for the Pope.

After repeated requests from Mary, as Gilles reported, as well as insistence from Gilles himself, a trip to Rome was finally organized, despite its cost and his family's economic difficulties. Only Gilles and his father participated in this trip.

On 12 December 1949 Gilles and his father were able to meet the pope in a non-private audience, but the child did not reveal the secret, because he claimed the Virgin Mary had instructed him to only reveal it to the pope. Not being able to convey the message to Pius XII, Gilles was disappointed, and still wanted to convey the message privately.

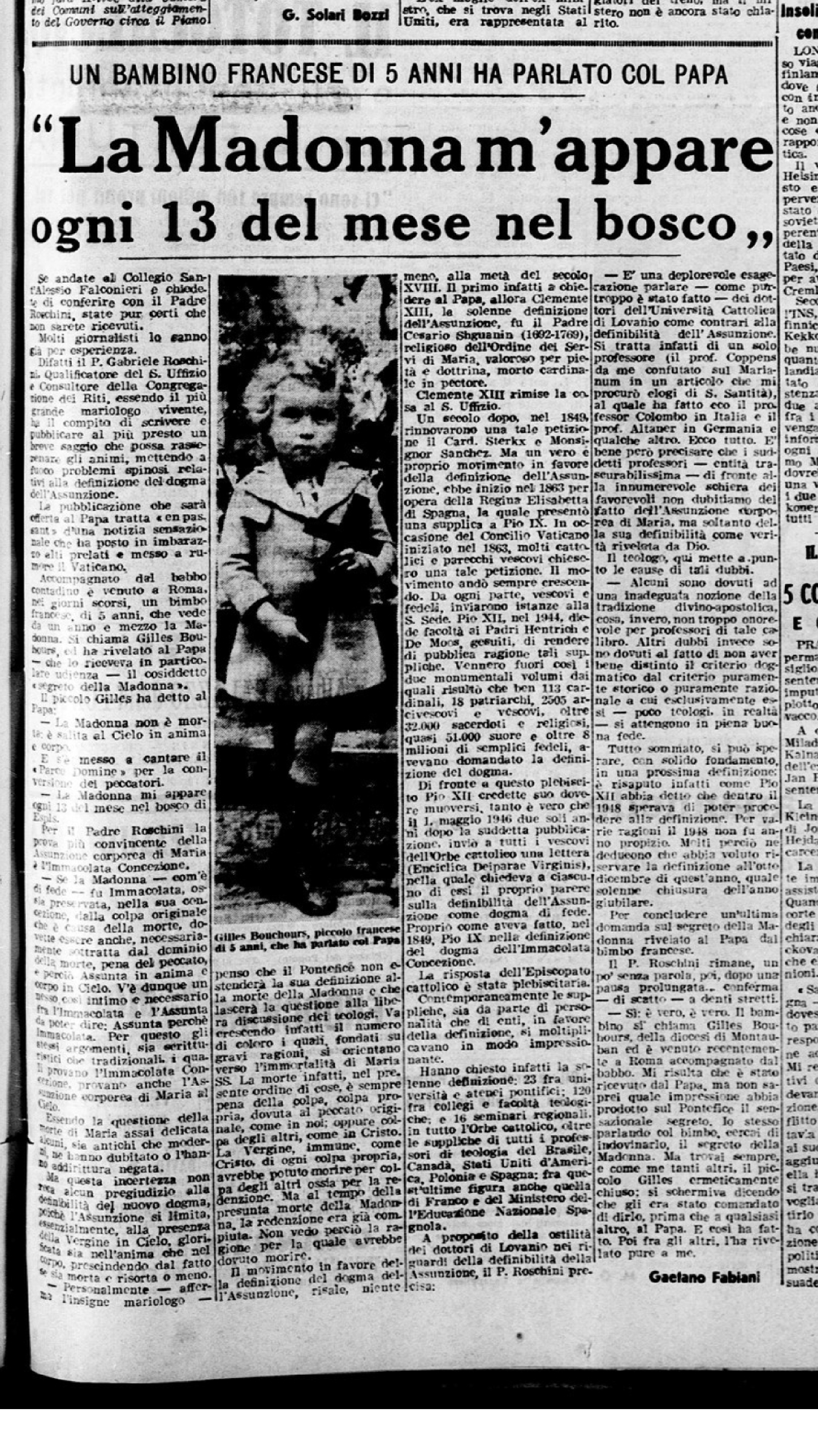
Article in Il Giornale d'Italia published on 10 June 1950 which speaks of the meeting between Gilles and Pope Pius XII

A second trip was thus organised, but was initially blocked due to the receipt of a letter denying the possibility for Gilles of being able to obtain a second audience with the pope, due to the sentences by the local Bishops against the 4 alleged visionaries of Espis, sentences which improperly they were also extended to little Gilles, given that Gilles was not named by these decrees. After various vicissitudes Gilles and his father finally managed to go to Rome at the end of April, and on 1 May 1950 Pope Pius XII received Gilles in a private audience. Once the message was sent to Pius XII, Gilles now was free to convey the message to other people as well. The message consisted of this: "The Blessed Virgin Mary is not dead; she ascended to heaven in body and soul." The visit did not go unnoticed, and on 10 June 1950 journalist Gaetano Fabiani from Il Giornale d'Italia published an article which detailed Gilles' message, entitled Un bambino francese di 5 anni ha parlato con Papa ('A 5-year-old French boy spoke to the Pope').

After Gilles' private meeting with the Pope, other articles also appeared in various newspapers, which described the meeting held between Gilles and the Pope as the case of little Gilles. Now, Gilles' phrase was a fairly simple and brief expression, but nevertheless it was considered, according to various well-informed sources, as the sign that Pope Pius XII had requested and expected from God, to confirm the proclamation of the dogma of the Assumption. Having obtained the required sign, Pope Pius XII proclaimed the dogma of the Assumption of Mary 6 months later (on 1 November 1950).

After the fulfillment of Gilles' mission, in transmitting the message to the Pope, from 1950 to 1958 Gilles declared that he was still visited at regular intervals by Mary. On 15 August 1958, according to Gilles, the Virgin appeared to him for the last time.

He died on 26 February 1960, at the age of 15, after a short 48-hour illness. Some doctors asserted that the death was caused by a crisis of uremia, while others believed that it was asthma. There was never a clear explanation of the cause of his death.

== Beatification process ==
A diocesan commission of inquiry was requested in 2014 by Archbishop of Toulouse, Robert Le Gall, in view of the possible future beatification of Gilles Bouhours.

== See also ==
- Pierre-Marie Théas

== Bibliography ==
- Guiot, Alain (2013). Mon petit Jésus de la Terre Paroles de Vierge (in French). Resiac. ISBN 978-2852684713.
- Guiot, Alain (2017). Gilles Bouhours – voyant de la vierge marie: Récit intégral des apparitions (in French). Rassemblement a son image. ISBN 978-2364635371.
- Guiot, Alain (2010). Gilles Bouhours. Les apparitions de la Vierge Marie à Gilles Bouhours (in French). Fernand Lanore. ISBN 978-2851575937.
- Marius, Jean F. E. C. (1970). Le Petit Gilles, Histoire De L'Adolescent Gilles Bouhours,1944–1960 (in French). Hovine. ISBN 978-2880220273.

=== External links ===
- Biography of Gilles Bouhours on https://tvba.fr (in French)
- Biography of Gilles Bouhours on vincent-de-tarle.fr (in French)
- Biographie Gilles Bouhours on https://www.mysticsofthechurch.com
- Biographie Gilles Bouhours on https://www.santiebeati.it/
- Biographie Gilles Bouhours on altervista.org
- Biographie Gilles Bouhours on http://trinite.1.free.fr
- Biographie Gilles Bouhours on http://www.santosebeatoscatolicos.com/
- Biographie Gilles Bouhours on https://es.catholic.net
