= Géraud du Puy =

French Roman-Catholic bishop

Géraud du Puy, also known as Géraud du Puy de Miremont (? – September 4, 1420) was a French, Roman-Catholic bishop of Montauban, Saint-Flour, Mende and Carcassonne. He also had a substantial political career.

He was perhaps born in Saint-Flour in Auvergne, although this is uncertain. On 13 November 1403, he was elected bishop of Montauban. One year later, on 17 December 1404, he also became bishop of Saint-Flour, although he didn't take office until 25 May 1410. On January 4, 1413, the bishopric of Mende was added, which ex officio made him also the count of Gévaudan, because of an arrangement in 1307 with the French crown. In May of the same year, his fourth and final title was added, the bishop of Carcassonne.

Next to his ecclesiastical career, du Puy had an extensive politic and diplomatic career. In 1415, he attended the Council of Constance and was sent on a mission to Paris to negotiate the resignation of pope Benedict XIII.

He died on September 4, 1420, in Carcassonne and is buried there in the cathedral.
