= The Massacre at Chios =

Painting by Eugène Delacroix

- Artist: Eugène Delacroix
- Year: 1824
- Medium: Oil on canvas
- Dimensions: 419 cm × 354 cm (164 in × 139 in)
- Location: Louvre, Paris

Scenes from the Massacre at Chios (French: Scènes des massacres de Scio) is the second major oil painting by the French artist Eugène Delacroix. The work is more than four meters tall, and shows some of the horror of the wartime destruction visited on the northern Aegean Sea island of Chios in the 1822 Chios massacre. A frieze-like display of suffering characters, military might, ornate and colourful costumes, terror, disease and death is shown in front of a scene of widespread desolation.

Unusual for a painting of civil ruin during this period, The Massacre at Chios has no heroic figure to counterbalance the crushed victims, and there is little to suggest hope among the ruin and despair. The vigour with which the aggressor is painted, contrasted with the dismal rendition of the victims, has drawn comment since the work was first hung, and some critics have charged that Delacroix might have tried to show some sympathy with the brutal occupiers. The painting was completed and displayed at the Salon of 1824 and hangs at the Musée du Louvre in Paris.

== Massacre ==
A military attack on the inhabitants of Chios by Ottoman forces commenced on 12 April 1822 and was prosecuted for several months into the summer of the same year. The campaign resulted in the deaths of twenty thousand citizens, and the forced deportation into slavery of almost all the surviving seventy thousand inhabitants.

== Composition ==
Delacroix had been greatly impressed by his fellow Parisian Théodore Géricault's The Raft of the Medusa, a painting for which he himself modeled as the young man at the front with the outstretched arm. The pyramidal arrangement that governs Géricault's painting is similarly seen with the figures in the foreground of The Massacre at Chios. On this unlikely layout of characters, Delacroix commented, "One must fill up; if it is less natural, it will be more beautiful and fécond. Would that everything should hold together!" The dense assembly of characters at the front is in marked contrast to the open and dispersed spaces behind them. Land and sea, light and shade appear as bands of drifting colours listlessly running into each other, and Delacroix appears to abandon the laws of perspective altogether with his rendering of clouds. The complete effect of this background is to suggest a constant opening out, dissolution and centrelessness. Aesthetician Heinrich Wölfflin identified this technique, and classified it a tectonic form.

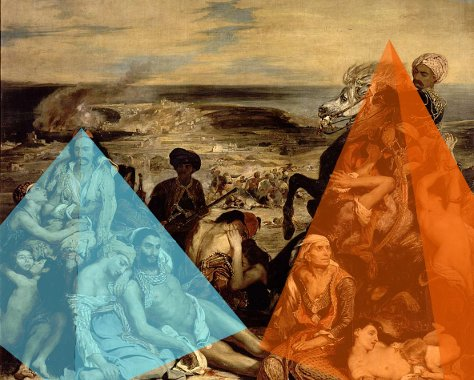
Compositional structure of two human pyramids

The thirteen civilians—men, women and children–have been rounded up for slaughter or enslavement. They are harshly presented to the viewer in an almost flat plane; slumped, disordered, and unevenly distributed. Their arrangement principally comprises two human pyramids–one pyramid to the left of the canvas culminating in the man with the red fez, and the other to the right culminating in the mounted soldier. The area between the two pyramids contains two soldiers in shadow, and two more Greek victims–a young man embraced by a young woman. The two men in the pyramid to the left are injured. The man at the front is on or near to the point of death, and the man poised at the top of the group appears unable to prepare a defence for himself. His gaze is in the direction of the suffering children in front of him, but it does not fall on them. This seeming detachment, coupled with the vacant stare of the dying man lend to this group an air of despondent resignation.

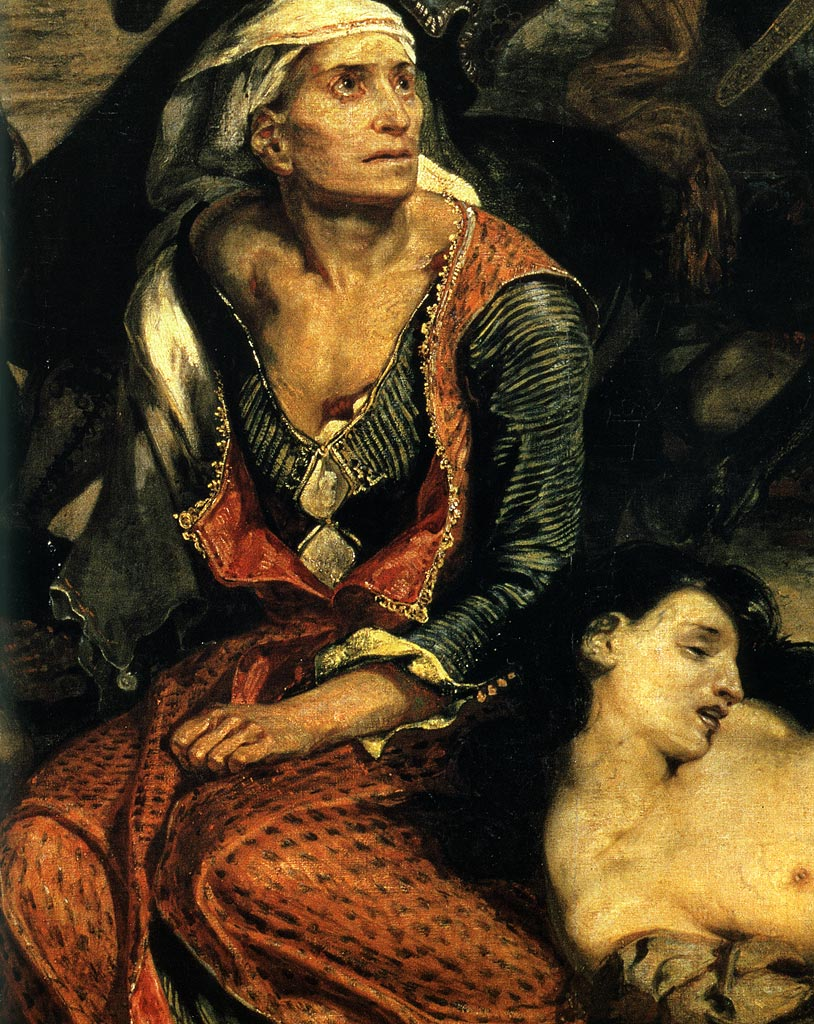
Figure of the old woman at the foot of the painting

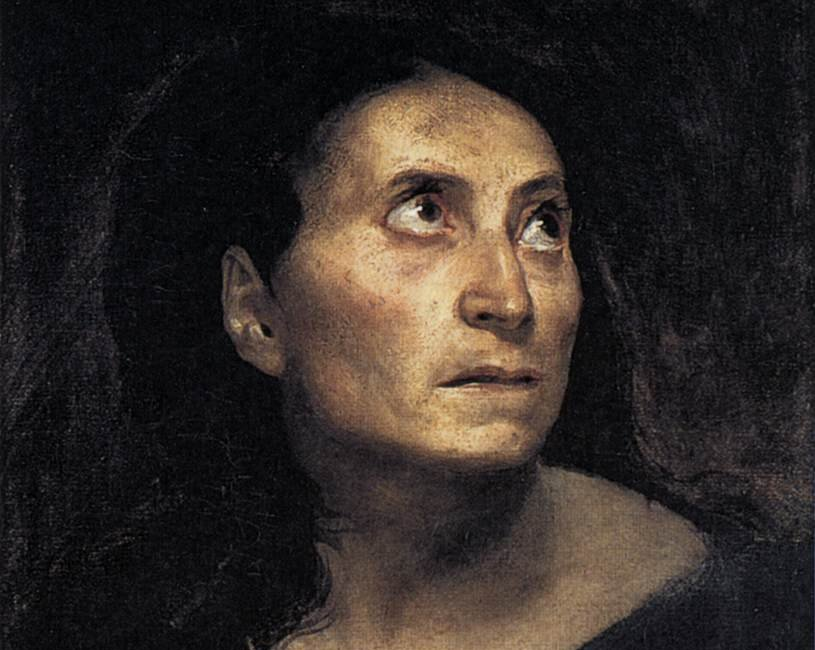
Detail from Delacroix's study Head of a Woman, 1824

In contrast, the human pyramid to the right has a vigorous vertical thrust. The writhing of the woman tied to the horse, the upward reaching stretch of the figure to her left, the shocking mane of the horse, and the twisting and commanding figure of the soldier upon it, all give dynamism to the grouping as it rises. But at the foot of the pyramid, an old woman raises her head to gaze into the sky, and to her right a baby seeks maternal comfort from a clenched-fisted corpse. Body parts including a hand and forearm, and an indistinct, congealed bloody mass hover grimly above the infant.

Of the rear, Elisabeth A. Fraser notes that "[t]he background cuts through the centre of the composition and drops inexplicably out and back from the cluster of [foreground] figures." This dramatic arrangement breaks the picture apart into fragments, with clumps of tangled bodies, scattered glances and other details competing for the viewers attention. In the middle distance, another mêlée of humanitarian disaster unfolds, and the background is an uneven display of sacked, burning settlements and scorched earth. Most of the Mediterranean horizon is painted with bleak earth colours, and it is punctuated only by smoke, the mane of the rearing horse and the head of the soldier.

== Figures ==
Delacroix reveals over a number of weeks' entries in his Journal a desire to try to get away from the academically sound and muscular figures of his previous work Dante and Virgil in Hell. Two studies Delacroix worked on at this time, Head of an Old Greek Woman and Girl Seated in a Cemetery, show the combination of unexaggerated modelling and accented contour he was striving to incorporate into his larger work. The final treatment of figures in the Massacre is however less consistent than these two studies. The flesh of the dead (or dying) man at the front is for instance strongly colouristically rendered, contrasting with the more tonal modelling of the nude to the right, and the Veronese-like schematic modelling of the baby.

== History ==
On 15 September 1821, Delacroix wrote to his friend Raymond Soulier that he wanted to make a reputation for himself by painting a scene from the Greek War of Independence, and have this painting displayed at the Salon. At this time Delacroix was not famous, and had yet to paint a canvas that was to be hung for public display. In the event, he decided to paint his Dante and Virgil in Hell, but even as this painting was revealed to the public in April 1822, the atrocities at Chios were being meted out in full force. In May 1823, Delacroix committed to paint a picture about the massacre.

When the Salon of 1824 opened on 25 August—an unusually late date for this institution—Delacroix's picture was shown there as exhibit no. 450 and entitled Scènes des massacres de Scio; familles grecques attendent la mort ou l'esclavage, etc. (English:Scenes of massacres at Chios; Greek families awaiting death or slavery, etc..) The painting was hung in the same room that housed Ingres' The Vow of Louis XIII. This display of two works exemplifying such a different approaches to the expression of form marked the beginning of the public rivalry between the two artists. Delacroix thought this was the moment the academy began to regard him as an "object of antipathy".

Alexandre Dumas reported that "there is always a group in front of the picture ..., painters of every school engaged in heated discussion". Both Dumas and Stendhal remarked that they thought the picture was a depiction of a plague, which in part it was. Antoine-Jean Gros, from whose Plague of Jaffa Delacroix had noticeably borrowed, called it "the massacre of painting". Ingres said the painting exemplified the 'fever and epilepsy' of modern art. Critics Girodet and Adolphe Thiers were, however, more flattering, and the painting was sufficiently well regarded for the state to purchase it the same year for the Musée du Luxembourg for 6000 francs. The purchase provoked internal conflicts in the Restoration arts administration, however, when the Comte de Forbin, director of the royal museums, bought the painting without the King's official approval, an irregular and politically risky procedure. In November 1874 it was transferred to the Musée du Louvre.

== In Greece ==
Naturally, Delacroix's painting aroused considerable attention in Greece. A draft of this painting, created under the supervision of Delacroix in his workshop by one of his students, is in display in the Athens War Museum. In 2009, a copy of the painting was displayed in the local Byzantine museum on Chios. It was withdrawn from the museum in November 2009 in a "good faith initiative" for the improvement of Greek-Turkish relations. However, the Greek press protested its removal. The copy is now back on display in the museum.

== See also ==
- The Raft of the Medusa
- Bonaparte Visiting the Plague Victims of Jaffa
- Scandals in art
- 100 Great Paintings, 1980 BBC series

== References and notes ==
Notes

1. His first major oil painting, Dante and Virgil in Hell, was painted in 1822.
2. 7 May 1824, according to Pach: The Journal of Eugène Delacroix, Walter Pach, Hacker Art Books, New York, 1937, and reissued in 1980, ISBN 0-87817-275-0, entry for May 7th, 1824. Page 85.
3. 9 April 1824, according to Pach: The Journal of Eugène Delacroix, Walter Pach, Hacker Art Books, New York, 1937, and reissued in 1980, ISBN 0-87817-275-0, entry for April 9th, 1824. Page 73.
4. 7 May 1824, according to Pach: The Journal of Eugène Delacroix, Walter Pach, Hacker Art Books, New York, 1937, and reissued in 1980, ISBN 0-87817-275-0, entry for May 7th, 1824. Page 85.
