= Head of an Old Greek Woman =

1823 painting by Eugène Delacroix

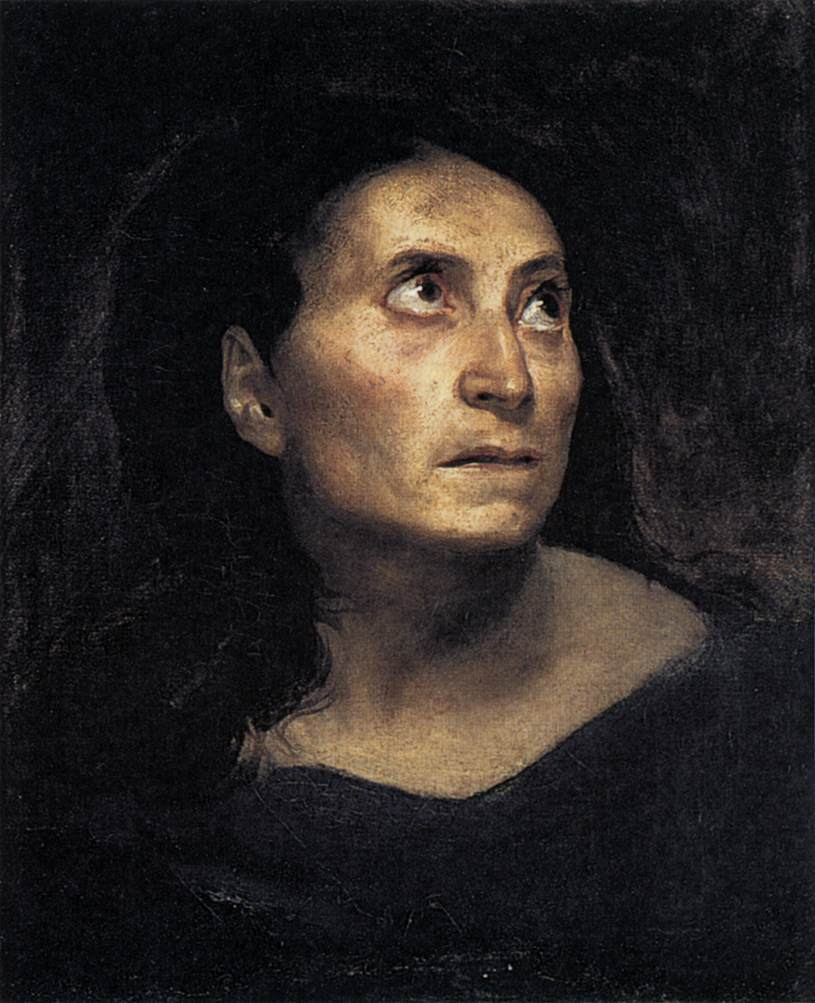
Head of a Woman (1823) by Eugène Delacroix. 41.5 cm (16.3 in) × 33.3 cm (13.1 in)

Head of an Old Greek Woman is a painting completed in 1824 by the French Romantic artist Eugène Delacroix. It is a study for his large oil painting The Massacre at Chios ("Scène des massacres de Scio"); a depiction of the Chios massacre which occurred in 1821 during the Greek War of Independence. The final work was completed for that year's Salon of 1824 in Paris. The final work was heavily influenced by Spanish artists and the French artist Théodore Géricault and shows the woman in full-length seated to the right next to a gruesomely depicted female corpse.

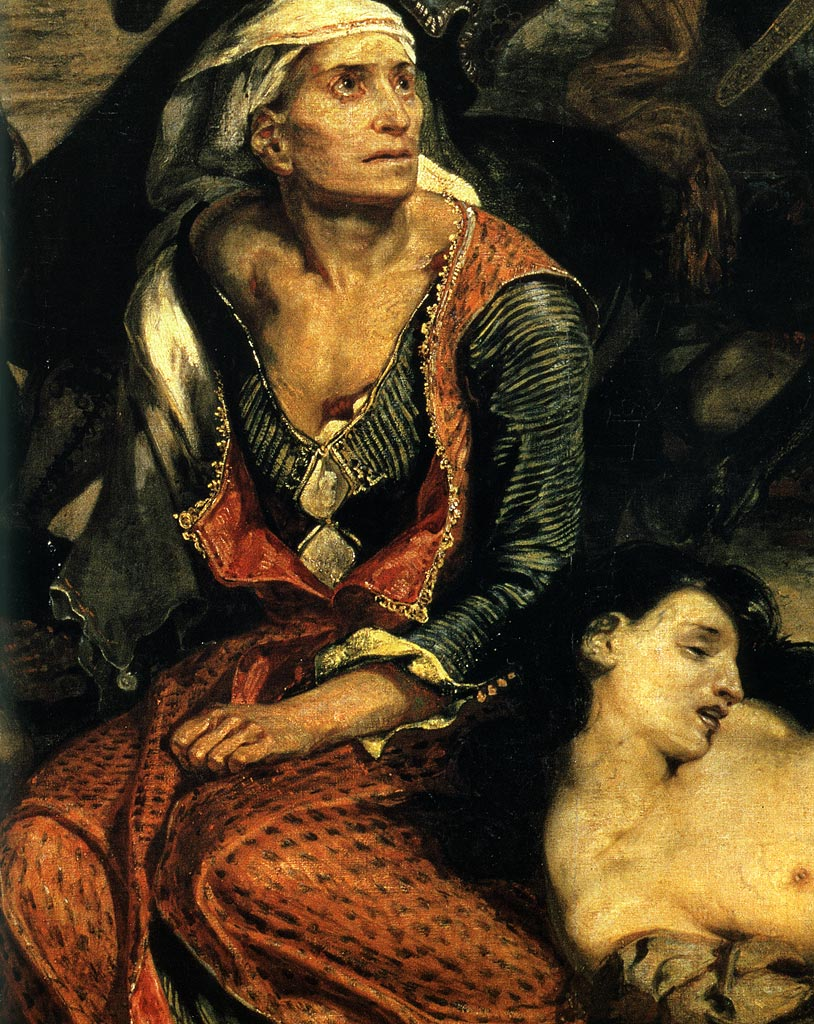
Final depiction on The Massacre at Chios

The painting is bust-length and was painted from life in oil on canvas or graphite. The image is tightly cropped, emphasising her fearful and near-weeping gaze. Her black dress, long dark hair, face and neck are rendered using chiaroscuro, although the final image is far more colourful.

Head of a Woman is owned by the Fine Arts museum of Orléans, France, and is on long term loan to the Metropolitan Museum of Art, New York.

== Sources ==
- Allard, Sébastian. Delacroix. Yale University Press, 2018. ISBN 978-1-5883-9651-8
- Tinterow, Garry. Manet/Velazquez: The French Taste for Spanish Painting. Metropolitan Museum of Art, 2003. ISBN 978-1-5883-9040-0
