= The Vow of Louis XIII =

Painting by Jean-Auguste-Dominique Ingres

- Le Voeu de Louis XIII (French)
- Artist: Jean-Auguste-Dominique Ingres
- Year: 1824
- Catalogue: The Paintings of J. A. D. Ingres (1954) 155; Palissy PM82000254; Salons ID 124570
- Medium: Oil on canvas
- Dimensions: 421 cm × 262 cm (166 in × 103 in)
- Designation: Classified as historical monument on Oct. 21, 1903
- Location: Montauban Cathedral
- Accession: D.2013.1.1

The Vow of Louis XIII is an 1824 oil painting on canvas by the French Neoclassical artist Jean-Auguste-Dominique Ingres, now in Montauban Cathedral. The painting depicts a vow to the Virgin Mary by Louis XIII of France.

It was commissioned by France's Ministry of Interior in August 1820 for the cathedral of Notre-Dame in Montauban. The subject of the painting was to be Louis XIII's vow in 1638 to consecrate his kingdom to the Virgin in Her Assumption. When Ingres accepted the commission, he was living in Florence. Although he had experienced success as a portrait painter, his ambition was to establish a reputation in the more prestigious genre of history painting. He went to work with his usual diligence, and spent four years bringing the large canvas to completion.

He traveled to Paris with it in October 1824. It was a critical success at that year's Salon and later established Ingres' reputation as the main representative of classicism in art, in opposition to the romanticism represented at the same Salon by The Massacre at Chios by Delacroix. Conceived in a Raphaelesque style relatively free of the archaisms for which he had been reproached in the past, it marked Ingres' grand return to the Paris art world after his years in Rome and Florence, and his abandonment of a more daring style. Ingres found himself celebrated throughout France. In January 1825 he was awarded the Cross of the Légion d'honneur by Charles X, and in June 1825 he was elected to the Institut de France.

Numerous life drawings and painted studies for the painting survive. A small oil sketch of the composition is in the Musée Ingres in Montauban. In the sketch the Virgin stands with her hands together and does not hold the Christ Child. For the final painting, Ingres adapted the pose of the seated Virgin and Child in Raphael's Madonna di Foligno, reversing it.

In 1855, Ingres repeated the figures of the Virgin and Child in a watercolor he made for his wife, Virgin and Child Appearing to Sts. Anthony of Padua and Leopold (Cambridge, Fogg Art Museum).

== Gallery ==
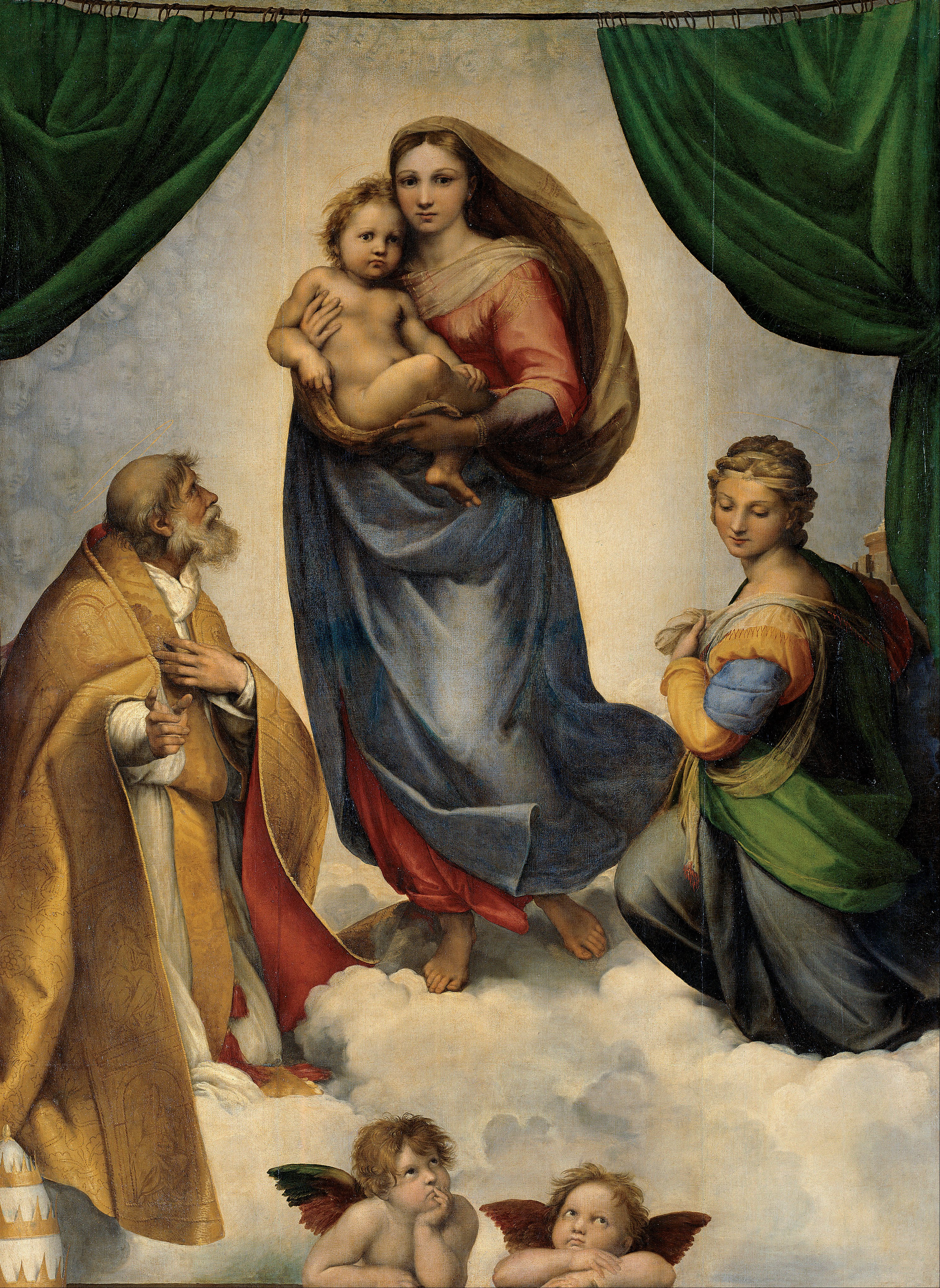
Raphael, Sistine Madonna, 1512–1513; an inspiration for Ingres' composition

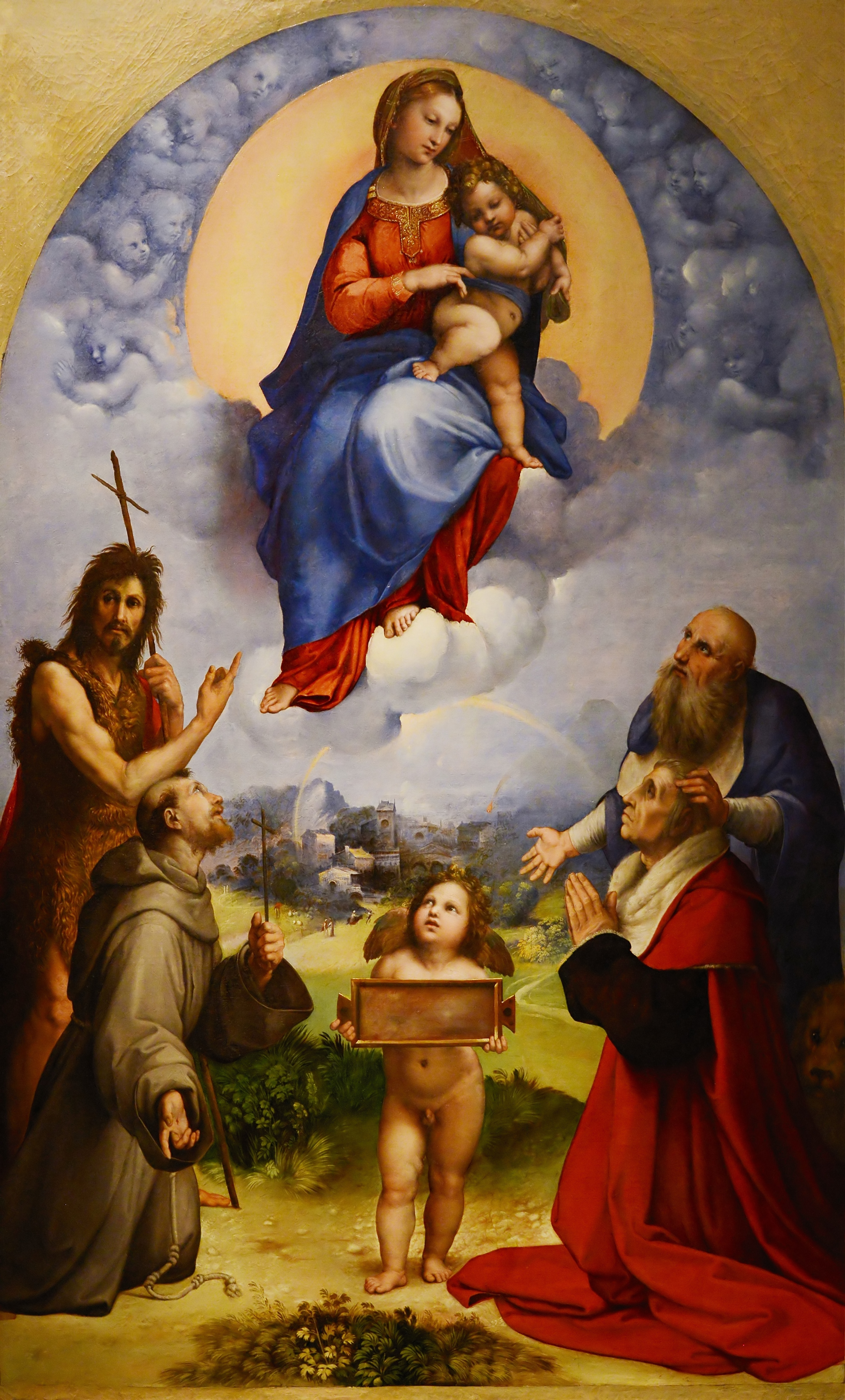
Raphael, Madonna di Foligno, 1511–1512, from which Ingres borrowed the pose of the Virgin

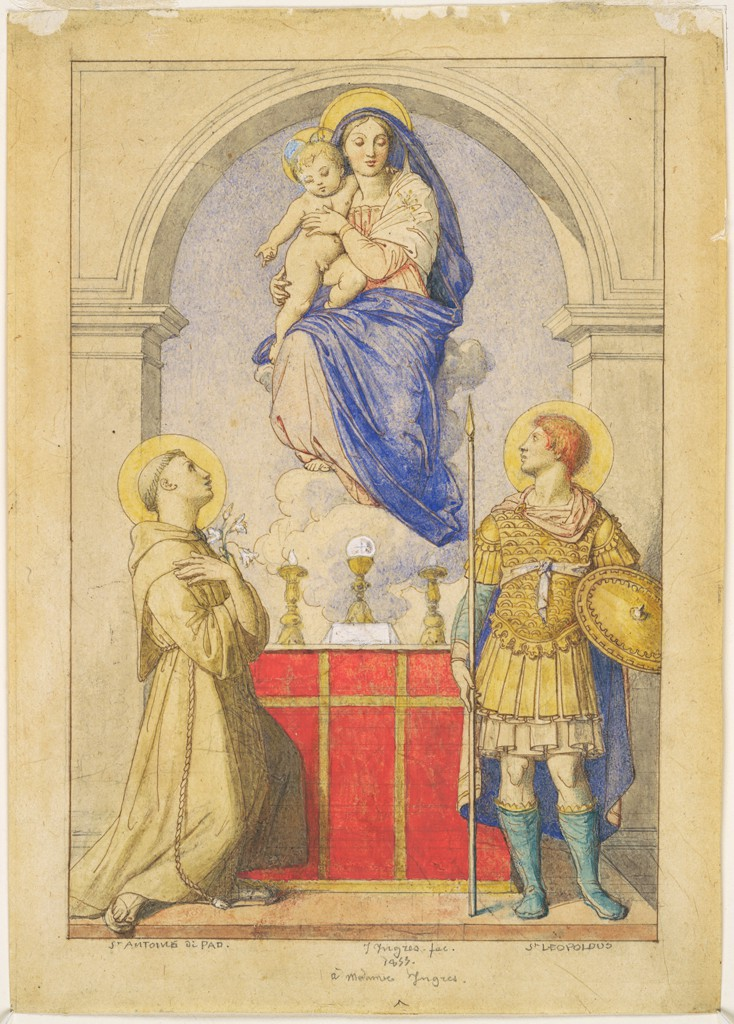
Ingres, Virgin and Child Appearing to Sts. Anthony of Padua and Leopold, watercolor, 1855

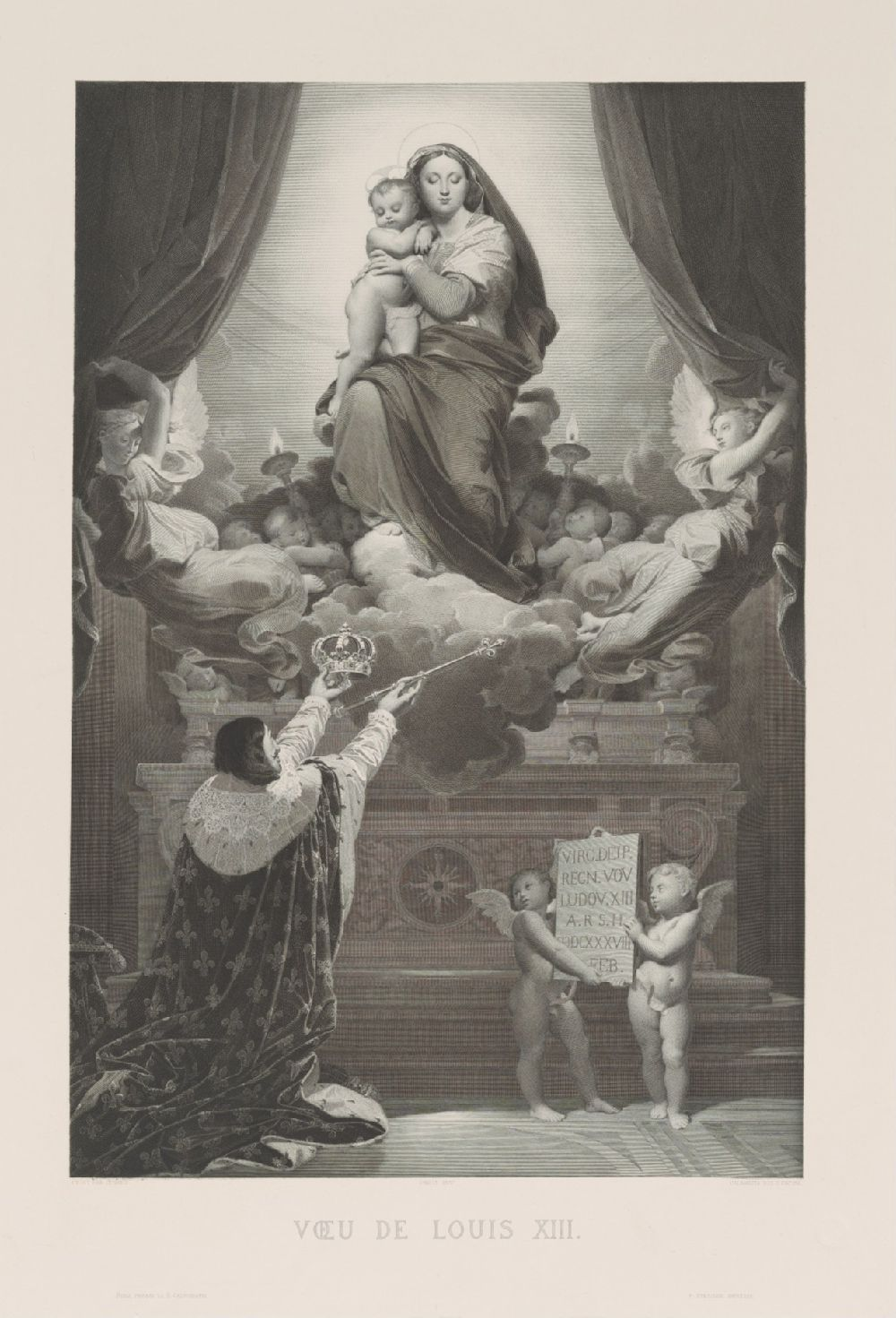
Luigi Calamatta after Jean-Auguste-Dominique Ingres, "The Vow of Louis XIII", engraving, c. 1886/1910, Department of Image Collections, National Gallery of Art Library, Washington, DC

== See also ==
- List of paintings by Jean-Auguste-Dominique Ingres

== Bibliography ==
- Arikha, Avigdor. J.A.D. Ingres: Fifty Life Drawings from the Musée Ingres at Montauban. Houston: The Museum of Fine Arts, 1986. ISBN 0-89090-036-1
- Condon, Patricia; Cohn, Marjorie B.; Mongan, Agnes. In Pursuit of Perfection: The Art of J.-A.-D. Ingres. Louisville: The J. B. Speed Art Museum, 1983. ISBN 0-9612276-0-5
- Radius, Emilio. L'opera completa di Ingres. Milan: Rizzoli, 1968. OCLC 58818848
- Rosenblum, Robert . Ingres, Paris, Cercle d'Art, coll. "La Bibliothèque des Grands Peintres", 1986. ISBN 2-7022-0192-X
- Ternois, Daniel. Ingres, Paris, Fernand Nathan, 1980. ISBN 2-09-284-557-8
- Tinterow, Gary; Conisbee, Philip; Naef, Hans. Portraits by Ingres: Image of an Epoch. New York: Harry N. Abrams, Inc., 1999. ISBN 0-8109-6536-4
