= Catholic University of Toulouse =

Coordinates: 43°35′43″N 1°26′35″E

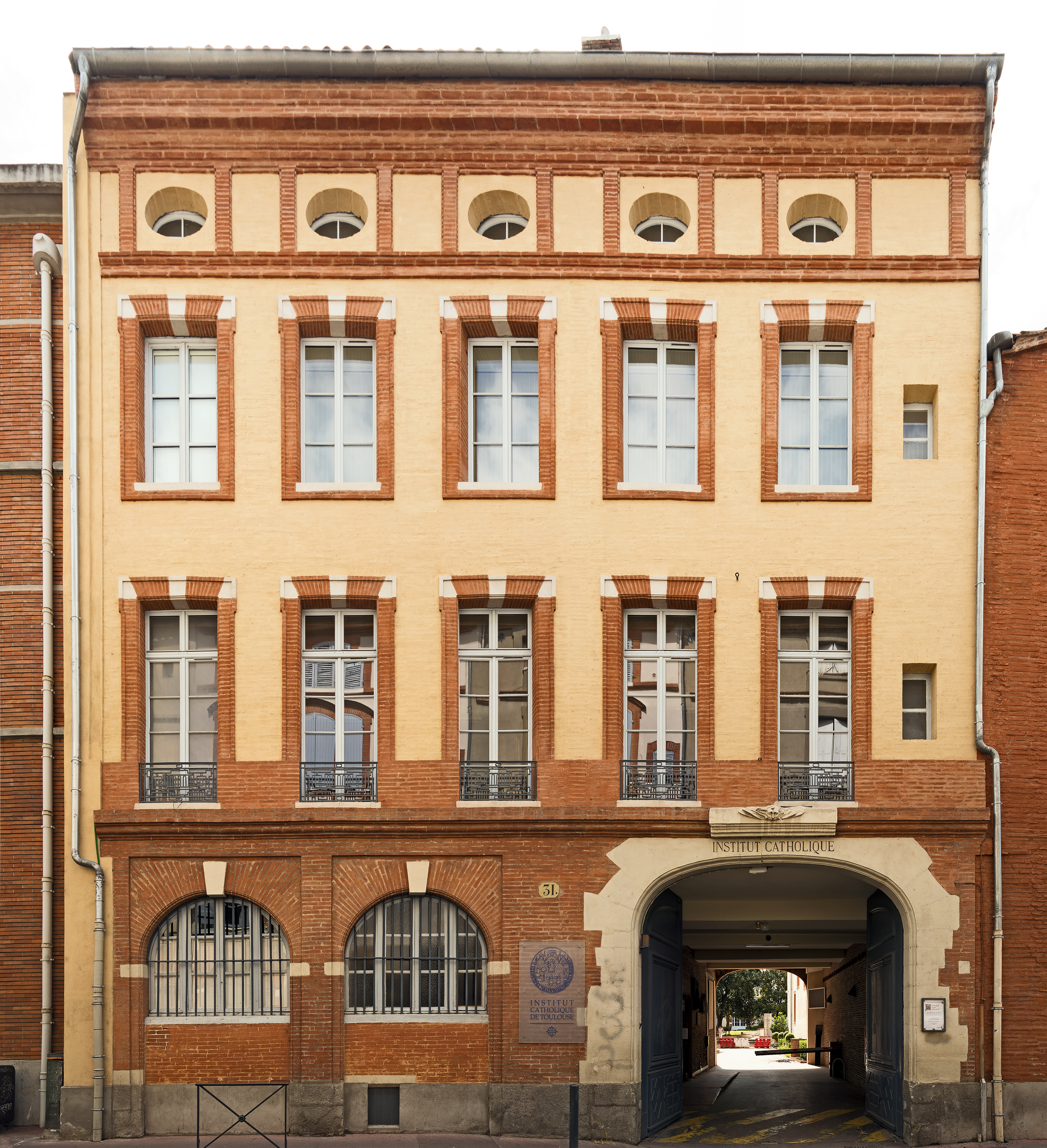
Institut Catholique de Toulouse, Entrance at rue de la Fonderie

The Institut Catholique de Toulouse (Occitan: Institut Catolic de Tolosa or ICT) is a Catholic establishment of higher education in Toulouse, France.

The Catholic Institute of Toulouse (ICT) is a private institution of higher education including the humanities and social sciences, law and theology, as well as polytechnics.

Located in the historic center of Toulouse, in buildings constructed between the fourteenth and eighteenth century, the Institute is shared between the various faculties and institutes. It has three auditoriums, a library, a chapel, numerous rooms, research laboratories, an archaeological and historical museums. It is located on the site of the old house where Saint Dominic lived. The school shares its name with an ancient Catholic University of Toulouse. An 1880 law forced private schools to stop using the name "University", the university has been known since as the Catholic Institute of Toulouse.

The Catholic Institute of Toulouse is one of five establishments of higher education founded by the bishops of France.

The Catholic Institute of Toulouse is a member of the International Federation of Catholic Universities, which includes 200 Catholic universities across the world and is one of 5 French Catholic institutes, including with Angers, Lille, Lyon and Paris.

On December 18, 2008, French government officials and the Vatican signed a decree in Paris regarding the recognition of diplomas, which entered into force on April 16, 2009. The university's qualifications, certificates and diplomas have been recognized around the world.

== Studies ==
=== Sectors of courses and qualifications ===
Law

- Free Faculty of Law, in partnership with Toulouse Capitole University.
- Faculty of Canon law.

Philosophy

- Faculty of Philosophy

Theology and Religious Arts

- Faculty of Theology
- Superior Institute of Religious Sciences (ISSR)
- Institute of Sacred Music (IMS)
- Institute for Religious and Pastoral Studies (IERP)

Humanities

- Free Faculty of Letters and Human Sciences, for Literature, Language, LAS, Psychology, Communication, History, Heritage and Tourism
- Institute of recruitment and training of Catholic education (teacher training schools and secondary) (ISFEC)
- University Institute of French Language and Culture (IULCF)

Schools attached to the Catholic University

- Higher Institute for Communication, broadcasting and multimedia ISCAM
- Engineering School of Purpan (EIP, formerly ESAP: Graduate School of Agriculture of Purpan)
- Institute for Training and Research in Health and Social Animation (monitors educators, aides, therapists, childcare) IFRASS
- Institute for Development and the works council IIDC
- Institut catholique d'arts et métiers de Toulouse (Toulouse ICAM)

Other training

- Examination Centre of the University of Cambridge (exam preparation at the university)

== Controversy ==
In October 2017 a big internal crisis emerged related to the gouvernance of the Catholic University of Toulouse when the rector decided to fire the dean of Philosophy Andrea Bellantone accused of harassment. After the matter became public, the bishops decided to step in to calm the situation. Both the dean and the rector were kept in place. Following that scandal, the rector Luc-Thomas Somme decided to resign a year later resulting in the resignations of philosophy professors and students.
