= Diocese of Montauban =

Catholic diocese in France

Coordinates: 44°00′37″N 1°21′31″E

Diocese of Montauban Dioecesis Montis Albani Diocèse de Montauban

Catholic
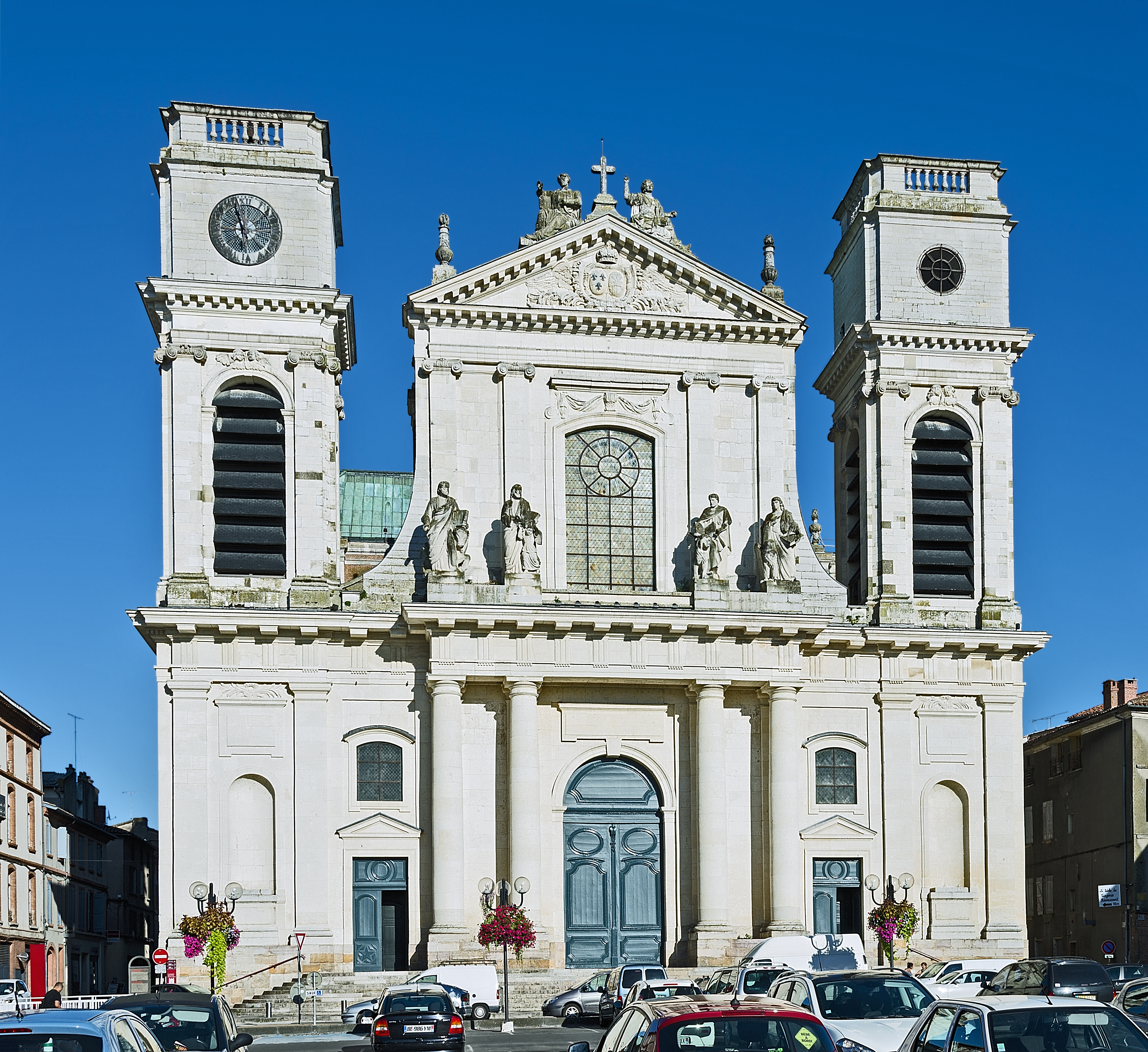
- Montauban Cathedral

Location
- Country: France
- Ecclesiastical province: Toulouse
- Metropolitan: Archdiocese of Toulouse

Statistics
- Area: 3,717 km^{2} (1,435 sq mi)
- Population: Total; Catholics: (as of 2021); 262,780 (est.); 185,450 (est.) (70.6%)
- Parishes: 321

Information
- Denomination: Roman Catholic
- Sui iuris church: Latin Church
- Rite: Roman Rite
- Established: 11 July 1317
- Cathedral: Cathedral of Notre Dame of the Assumption in Montauban
- Secular priests: 61 (Diocesan); 6 (Religious Orders); 10 Permanent Deacons

Current leadership
- Pope: Leo XIV
- Bishop: Alain Guellec
- Metropolitan Archbishop: Guy de Kerimel
- Bishops emeritus: Jacques de Saint-Blanquat; Bernard Ginoux

Map

Website
- Website of the Diocese

The Diocese of Montauban (Latin: Dioecesis Montis Albani; French: Diocèse de Montauban) is a Latin Church diocese of the Catholic Church in France. The diocese is coextensive with Tarn-et-Garonne, and is currently a suffragan of the Archdiocese of Toulouse. The episcopal seat of the Diocese of Montauban is in Montauban Cathedral.

Suppressed under the Concordat of 1802 and divided between the three neighbouring dioceses of Toulouse, Agen, and Cahors, Montauban was re-established by imperial decree of 1809, but this measure was not approved by the Holy See. Re-established by the Concordat of 1817, the diocese did not receive a bishop approved by the Papacy until 1824.

In 2021, in the Diocese of Montauban there was one priest for every 2,767 Catholics.

== History ==
Legend attributes to Clovis the foundation of Moissac Abbey in 506, but Saint Amand (594–675) seems to have been the first abbot. The abbey grew, and in a few years its possessions extended to the gates of Toulouse. The church of Moissac, formerly the abbey church, has a portal built in 1107 which is a veritable museum of Romanesque sculpture; its cloister (1100–1108) is one of the most remarkable in France.

=== Moissac Abbey ===
The threats and incursions of the Saracens, Hungarians, and Northmen brought the monks of Moissac to elect "knight abbots" who were laymen, and whose mission was to defend them. From the tenth to the thirteenth century several of the counts of Toulouse were knight-abbots of Moissac; the death of Alfonso, Count of Poitou (1271) made the King of France the legitimate successor of the counts of Toulouse, and in this way the abbey came to depend directly on the kings of France, henceforth its "knight-abbots". The union of Moissac with Cluny was begun by Abbot Stephen as early as 1047, and completed in 1063 under Abbot Durand. Four filial abbeys and numerous priories depended on Moissac Abbey. In 1618 Moissac was transformed into a collegiate church which had, among other titulars, Cardinal Mazarin (1644–1661), and Cardinal de Loménie de Brienne, minister of Louis XVI (1775–1788).

=== Montauriol Abbey ===
In 820 Benedictine monks had founded Montauriol Abbey under the patronage of Saint Martin; subsequently, it adopted the name of its abbot Saint Theodard, Archbishop of Narbonne, who died at the abbey in 893. The Count of Toulouse, Alphonse Jourdan, took from the abbey in 1144 its lands on the heights overlooking the right bank of the Tarn, and founded there the city of Montauban; a certain number of inhabitants of Montauriol and serfs of the abbey formed the nucleus of the population. The monks protested, and in 1149 a satisfactory agreement was concluded.

=== New ecclesiastical province ===
Notwithstanding the sufferings of Montauban during the Albigensian wars, the Diocese of Toulouse grew rapidly. Pope John XXII, by the Bull Salvator (25 June 1317), separated the see of Toulouse from the ecclesiastical province of Narbonne, making the see of Toulouse an archiepiscopal see, and giving it four dioceses as suffragans that were created from within its territory: the Diocese of Montauban, the Diocese of St.-Papoul, the Diocese of Rieux, and the Diocese of Lombez. Bertrand de Puy, abbot at Montauriol, was first bishop of Montauban. Bishop Bertrand was consecrated in Avignon on 5 August, but, as he was making his way back to his new diocese, he died on the road.

From 19 January 1361 to August 1369, Montauban, which had been occupied by John Chandos, Lieutenant-General of the King Edward III of England, was in the hands of the English.

==== Cathedral and Chapter ====
On 30 July 1317, in the Bull Nuper ex certis, Pope John freed the church of Montauban, which he had erected into a cathedral with a Chapter, from all other jurisdictions, in particular from the diocese of Toulouse, Cahors, Bourges, and Narbonne, and from the Benedictine Order.

The monastery church of Montauriol, which became the Cathedral, had been dedicated to Saints Martin and Theodore. It was pillaged and burnt by the Protestants on 20 December 1561. Only one of the towers remained standing, and it was destroyed in 1567 for the sake of building materials for fortifications. The Chapter was composed of twenty-four Canons, to which were added some sixty other clerics, variously called hebdomadaries, prebendaries, or simply clerics. The Chapter was led by a pair of 'dignities' (not dignitaries): the Provost and the Major Archdeacon.

In 1630, after the destruction of the Cathedral of Saint-Martin by the Protestants, the bishop united the Chapter with the Chapter of the Collegiate Church of Notre-Dame, and that church, rededicated to Saint James, became the cathedral of the diocese. In 1674, after the Huguenot Wars, when Catholics were still outnumbered by Protestants by two-to-one, the destroyed cathedral of Montauban had three dignities, three persons, and eighteen Canons. The foundation stone of the present cathedral of the Assumption was laid in 1692. In 1762, the population had risen to c. 15,000, and the Cathedral boasted six dignities and eighteen Canons.

There was a second Chapter in the diocese, at the Collegiate Church of Saint-Étienne de Tascon in Montaubon, headed by a Dean. It was erected into a collegiate church by Pope John XXII in 1318. Destroyed in 1561 by the Huguenots, it was reconstructed by Bishop de Colbert in 1680.

=== Protestant ascendency ===
Huguenot control (purple) and influence (violet), 16th century

Despite the resistance of Jacques des Prés-Montpezat (1556–1589), a nephew of Jean de Lettes whom he succeeded him as bishop, the Calvinists became masters of the city; in 1561 they interdicted Catholic worship; the destruction of the churches, and even of the cathedral, was begun and carried on until 1567. In 1570 Montauban became one of the four strongholds granted the Protestants and in 1578, 1579, and 1584 harboured the synods held by the députés of the Reformed Church of France.

The general synod of the Reformers held at Montpellier, in May, 1598, decided on the creation of an academy at Montauban; it was opened in 1600, was exclusively Protestant, and gathered students from other countries of Europe. In 1632 the Jesuits established themselves at Montauban, but in 1659 transferred the Academy to Puylaurens. In 1808 a faculty of Protestant theology was created at Montauban and still exists. By a decree of 15 September 1809, the Grand Master of the University fixed the number of professors at six.

For a short time, in 1600, Catholic worship was re-established but was soon suppressed. Bishop Anne Carrion de Murviel (1600–1652), declining the honor of martyrdom, withdrew to Montech during the greater part of his reign and left his flock to be administered through deputies who did not fear the Protestants. In spite of the unsuccessful siege of Montauban by Louis XIII (August–November, 1621), the fall of La Rochelle (1629) entailed the submission of the city, and Richelieu entered it on 20 August 1629.

In 1626 the Jesuits were sent to Montauban, but in 1628 they were expelled along with all the other Catholics. They returned in 1629 after the fall of La Rochelle, but were forced to make a temporary retreat due to the plague. They were recalled in 1630 by Bishop Anne de Murviel, and they were granted half the positions in the Collège in 1633. They took over the other half when the Protestants moved to Puylaurens in 1662. They continued to staff the Collège until the Jesuits were expelled from France by edict of Louis XV on 2 February 1763.

=== Revolution ===
The diocese of Montauban was one of the fifty dioceses that were abolished by decree of the National Assembly in 1790, in the Civil Constitution of the Clergy, an act which was uncanonical. The territory of the diocese, which fell into the new Department of Tarn-et-Garonne, but Montauban was not the largest city in the department, and therefore it was denied a bishop in the new Constitutional Church.

Bishop Le Tonnelier de Breteuil (1762–1794) died during the Reign of Terror on 14 August 1794, in the prison of Rouen, after converting the philosopher La Harpe to Catholicism.

In 1793 the Abbey of Moissac was closed, along with all the other monastic institutions in France. The Cathedral Chapter was also disbanded.

=== Church of the Concordat ===
The diocese was recreated, uncanonically, by the Emperor Napoleon I in 1808, and he offered the diocese to Jean-Armand Chaudru de Trélissac, the pre-Revolutionary Vicar General of Montauban, who refused the offer. Other offers were made, but not confirmed by Pope Pius VII.

Under the Concordat, however, Bonaparte exercised the same privileges as had the kings of France, especially that of nominating bishops for vacant dioceses, with the approval of the Pope. The practice continued until the Restoration in 1815, when the privilege of nomination returned to the hands of the King of France. On the occasion of the proclamation of the Empire in 1804, Archbishop de Cicé was made a member of the Legion of Honor and a Count of the Empire.

In accordance with the Concordat between Pope Pius VII and King Louis XVIII, signed on 11 June 1817, the diocese of Montauban was to be restored. The Concordat, however, was never ratified by the French National Assembly, which had the reputation of being more royalist than the King, and therefore, ironically, Napoleonic legislation was never removed from the legal code (as agreed in the Concordat of 1817) and the terms of the Concordat of 1817 never became state law.

In 1881 and 1882, Jules Ferry was responsible for the enactment of the Jules Ferry Laws, establishing free primary education throughout France, and mandatory secular education. This removed church control over public education.

The low point in relations between the Vatican and Paris came in 1905, with the Law on the Separation of the Churches and the State. This meant, among other things, the end of financial support on the part of the French government and all of its subdivisions of any religious group. An inventory was ordered of all places of worship that had received subsidies from the State, and all property not legally subject to a pious foundation was to be confiscated to the State. That was a violation of the Concordat of 1801. In addition the State demanded repayment of all loans and subsidies given the Churches during the term of the Concordat. On 11 February 1906, Pope Pius X responded with the encyclical Vehementer Nos, which condemned the Law of 1905 as a unilateral abrogation of the Concordat. He wrote, "That the State must be separated from the Church is a thesis absolutely false, a most pernicious error." Diplomatic relations were broken, and did not resume until 1921.

=== After concordats ===
Despite huge losses in property and income, the diocese of Montauban was still able to maintain the École Saint-Théodard in Montauban for young men, and the École Jeanne-d'Arc in Montauban for young women. It also operated the Minor Seminary of the Sacred Heart, and the Institut familial.

During World War I, 109 priests and 24 seminarians participated in the conflict. 9 priests and 6 seminarians died. They won one Legion of Honor, one Médaille militaire, and 43 Croix de guerre.

During World War II, Montauban was a significant transit point for persons fleeing the Nazis and the Vichy government. Bishop Théas had a well-known positive attitude toward the Jews, protesting publicly against their deportation and mistreatment. He also protested publicly against the drafting of French youth into the Service du Travail Obligatoire (STO). He was arrested by the Gestapo on 9 June 1944 and interned in Toulouse; he was liberated on 30 August 1944 by the US 28th Infantry Division. The socialist former Prime Minister Léon Blum recommended Montauban to Austrian socialist leaders, and Montauban had an active office of the American Friends Service Committee (Quakers), who aided in arranging passage to Spain.

=== Religious associations ===
There was a convent of Cistercian monks at Belleperche (Bella pertica).

The Hermits of Saint Augustine (O.E.S.A.) had a house at Montauban before 1345, headed by a Prior. The Calvinists burned the buildings on 21 August 1561, and demolished them in 1568 for building materials. They returned to Montauban in 1632, but did not recover their properties until Bishop de Bertier granted them provisionally in 1662. He also consecrated the new church in 1665.

The Capuchins (O.F.M.Cap.) came to Montauban in 1629 on a preaching mission, but were driven out temporarily by the plague. In 1630 they were given property by the King and then by the consuls of Montauban, and with a gift of 6,000 livres by the Duc d'Épernon, with which they built the Hôpital-Saint-Roch, their convent and their church. The Capuchins were expelled in the anticlerical legislation of 1895-1905. and their buildings were converted for use as the diocesan Major Seminary.

The Friars Minor Conventuals (Cordeliers, O.F.M.Conv.) had established themselves in Montauban before 1251, when they found themselves in trouble with Bishop Guillaume of Agen for usurping the fiefs of the Chapter, and for hearing confessions in the parishes of the city; the dispute with the Chapter continued until 1348. In the 15th century they received substantial gifts from the Seigneur de la Gravière, Notet Seguier. Along with other religious orders they were expelled by the Huguenots in 1561, and their convent was turned into a prison for a time, and then was razed to the foundations. They were restored in 1631. After they were again dissolved by the French Revolution, their buildings were occupied by the Ursulines.

In 1251 the Dominicans (O.P.) established a house in Montauban in the Faubourg Saint-Étienne, colonized from their house in Cahors. A provincial Chapter was held in their convent in 1303, at which time the first Mass took place in their church. In 1561 the Calvinists seized the church and made it a Protestant house of worship, though they destroyed it in 1565 to make a fort, which was destroyed by Cardinal Richelieu in 1629, under whose protection they returned to Montauban. Another provincial Chapter of their Order took place in the new buildings in 1685. The Sisters of Mercy came to occupy the buildings after the Bourbon Restoration.

The Carmelites (O.Carm.) were established in Montauban before 1277. They were expelled by the Calvinists in 1561, and when they returned in 1632, their church and their convent had completely disappeared. In 1635 they established their legal claim on the land, and rebuilt their house and a chapel.

There was a convent of Clarisses (O.S.C.) as early as 1258, and the Ursulines were established in 1639. The buildings of the Clarisses were taken over by the Protestant School of Theology.

On 25 July 1523, fifteen inhabitants of Moissac, after they had made a pilgrimage to Compostela, grouped themselves into a confraternity "à l'honneur de Dieu, de Notre Dame et Monseigneur Saint Jacques". This confraternity, reorganized in 1615 by letters patent of Louis XIII, existed for many years. As late as 1830 "pilgrims" were still seen in the Moissac processions. In fact Moissac and Spain were long closely united; a monk of Moissac, Gerald of Braga, was Archbishop of Braga from 1095 to 1109.

The principal pilgrimages of the diocese are: Notre Dame de Livron or de la Déliverance, visited by Blanche of Castile and Louis XIII; Notre Dame de Lorm, at Castelferrus, dating from the fifteenth century; Notre Dame de la Peyrouse, near Lafrançaise.

Among the congregations of women found in the diocese in 1913 were: Sisters of Mercy, hospitallers and teachers, founded in 1804 (mother-house at Moissac); Sisters of the Guardian Angel, hospitallers and teachers, founded in 1839 at Quillan in the Diocese of Carcassonne by Father Gabriel Deshayes, Superior of the Daughters of Wisdom, whose mother-house was transferred to the château of La Molle, near Montauban in 1858.

In 2017 the diocese of Montauban was host to the following religious communities of men: the Missions Etrangères de Paris, the Ermites de Saint-Bruno, the Pères Blancs, and the Foyer d' Amitié; and the following religious communities of women: the Carmelites Missionaires, the Dominicaines de la Présentation de la Sainte Vierge, the Dominicaines du Saint Nom de Jésus, the Congregation de la Sainte-Famille, the Soeurs de la Miséricorde, the Soeurs de l'Ange Gardien, the Ursulines de l'Union Romaine and the Communauté Marie Mère de l'Eglise.

== Bishops ==
=== from 1317 to 1519 ===
- 1317 : Bertrand (I) du Puy, O.S.B.
- 1317–1355 : Guillaume de Cardaillac
- 1355–1357 : Jacques (I) de Daux (Deaulx)
- 1357–1361 : Bertrand (II) de Cardaillac
- 1361–1368 : Arnaud Bernardi du Pouget (Administrator)
- 1368–1379 : Pierre (I) de Chalais
- 1380–1403 : Bertrand (III) Robert de Saint-Jal (Avignon Obedience)
- 1403–1404 : Géraud du Puy
- 1404–1424 : Raymond de Bar
- 1424–1425 : Gérard de Faidit
- 1425–1427 : Pierre de Cottines
- 1427–1445 : Bernard de la Roche Fontenilles, O.Min.
- 1446–1449 : Aymery de Roquemaurel
- 1450–1452 : Bernard de Rousergues
- 1452–1453 : Guillaume d'Estampes
- 1454–1470 : Jean de Batut de Montrosier
- 1470–1484 : Jean de Montalembert, O.S.B.Clun.

1484 : Georges de Viguerie

- 1484–1491 : Georges d'Amboise
- 1491–1519 : Jean d'Auriolle

=== from 1519 to 1800 ===
- 1519–1539 : Jean des Prés-Montpezat
- 1539–1556 : Jean de Lettes-Montpezat
- 1556–1589 : Jacques II des Prés-Montpezat

1589 – 1600 " Sede Vacante

(1589–1600) : Claude de Champaigne, administrator

- 1600–1652 : Anne Carrion de Murviel
- 1652–1674 : Pierre de Bertier
- 1675–1693 : Jean-Baptiste Michel de Colbert
- 1693–1703 : Henri de Nesmond
- 1703–1728 : François d'Haussonville de Nettancourt Vaubecourt
- 1728–1763 : Michel de Verthamon de Chavagnac
- 1763–1794 : Anne-François Victor le Tonnelier de Breteuil

1794–1817 : Sede Vacante

=== since 1800 ===
- 1817–1824 : Jean-Armand Chaudru de Trélissac, administrator
- 1824–1826 : Jean-Louis Lefebvre de Cheverus
- 1826–1833 : Louis-Guillaume-Valentin DuBourg
- 1833–1844 : Jean-Armand Chaudru de Trelissac
- 1844–1871 : Jean-Marie Doney
- 1871–1882 : Théodore Legain
- 1882–1908 : Adolphe-Josué-Frédéric Fiard
- 1908–1929 : Pierre-Eugène-Alexandre Marty
- 1929–1935 : Clément Émile Roques
- 1935–1940 : Elie-Antoine Durand
- 1940–1947 : Pierre-Marie Théas
- 1947–1970 : Louis de Courrèges d'Ustou
- 1970–1975 : Roger Tort
- 1975–1996 : Jacques de Saint-Blanquat
- 1996–2007 : Bernard Housset
- 2007–2022 : Bernard Ginoux
- 2022–present : Alain Guellec

== See also ==
- Catholic Church in France

== Bibliography ==
Reference books

- Gams, Pius Bonifatius (1873). Series episcoporum Ecclesiae catholicae: quotquot innotuerunt a beato Petro apostolo. Ratisbon: Typis et Sumptibus Georgii Josephi Manz. pp. 479–480. (Use with caution; obsolete)
- Eubel, Conradus, ed. (1913). Hierarchia catholica, Tomus 1 (second ed.). Münster: Libreria Regensbergiana. pp. 76–77. (in Latin)
- Eubel, Conradus, ed. (1914). Hierarchia catholica, Tomus 2 (second ed.). Münster: Libreria Regensbergiana. p. .
- Gulik, Guilelmus (1923). Eubel, Conradus (ed.). Hierarchia catholica, Tomus 3 (second ed.). Münster: Libreria Regensbergiana. p. .
- Gauchat, Patritius (Patrice) (1935). Hierarchia catholica IV (1592-1667). Münster: Libraria Regensbergiana. p. .
- Ritzler, Remigius; Sefrin, Pirminus (1952). Hierarchia catholica medii et recentis aevi V (1667-1730). Patavii: Messagero di S. Antonio. p. .
- Ritzler, Remigius; Sefrin, Pirminus (1958). Hierarchia catholica medii et recentis aevi VI (1730-1799). Patavii: Messagero di S. Antonio. pp. .
- Ritzler, Remigius; Sefrin, Pirminus (1968). Hierarchia Catholica medii et recentioris aevi sive summorum pontificum, S. R. E. cardinalium, ecclesiarum antistitum series... A pontificatu Pii PP. VII (1800) usque ad pontificatum Gregorii PP. XVI (1846) (in Latin). Vol. VII. Monasterii: Libr. Regensburgiana.
- Remigius Ritzler; Pirminus Sefrin (1978). Hierarchia catholica Medii et recentioris aevi... A Pontificatu PII PP. IX (1846) usque ad Pontificatum Leonis PP. XIII (1903) (in Latin). Vol. VIII. Il Messaggero di S. Antonio.
- Pięta, Zenon (2002). Hierarchia catholica medii et recentioris aevi... A pontificatu Pii PP. X (1903) usque ad pontificatum Benedictii PP. XV (1922) (in Latin). Vol. IX. Padua: Messagero di San Antonio. ISBN 978-88-250-1000-8.

Studies

- Darrow, Margaret H. (2014). "Chapter Two: Montauban in Revolution". Revolution in the House: Family, Class, and Inheritance in Southern France, 1775-1825. Princeton University Press. pp. 20–54. ISBN 978-1-4008-6034-0.
- Daux, Camille (1881). Histoire de l'église de Montauban (in French). Vol. Tome premier. Montauban: Bray et Retaux. [Pagination is not continuous, but begins anew with each 'Period'. The biography of each bishop was issued separately, each with its own pagination.]
- Daux, Camille (1882). Histoire de l'église de Montauban (in French). Vol. Tome II. Montauban: Bray et Retaux.
- De Vic, Cl.; Vaissete, J. (1876). Histoire generale de Languedoc (in French). Vol. Tome IV. Toulouse: Edouard Privat.
- Jean, Armand (1891). Les évêques et les archevêques de France depuis 1682 jusqu'à 1801 (in French). Paris: A. Picard. pp. 395–397.
- Le Bret, Henry (1841). Marcellin et Gabriel Ruck (ed.). Histoire de Montauban (in French). Vol. Tome premier (nouvelle ed.). Montauban: chez Rhetoré.
- Ligou, Daniel (1954). "La structure sociale du Protestantisme Montalbanais à la fin du XVIIIe siècle," Bulletin de la Société de l'histoire du Protestantisme français 100 (1954), pp. 93–110. (in French)
- Moulenq, François (1880). Documents historiques sur le Tarn-et-Garonne, diocése, abbayes, chapitres, commanderies, églises, seigneuries, etc (in French). Vol. Tome second. Montauban: Forestie.
- Sainte-Marthe, Denis de (1785). Gallia christiana, in provincias ecclesiasticas distributa (in Latin). Vol. Tomus decimus-tertius (13) (second ed.). Paris: Johannes- Baptista Coignard. pp. 226–266, Instrumenta, pp. 181–220.
- Société bibliographique (France) (1907). L'épiscopat français depuis le Concordat jusqu'à la Séparation (1802-1905). Paris: Librairie des Saints-Pères.
