= Montauban Cathedral =

Cathedral in Montauban, France

Coordinates: 44°0′55″N 1°21′19″E

Montauban Cathedral Cathédrale Notre-Dame-de-l'Assomption de Montauban
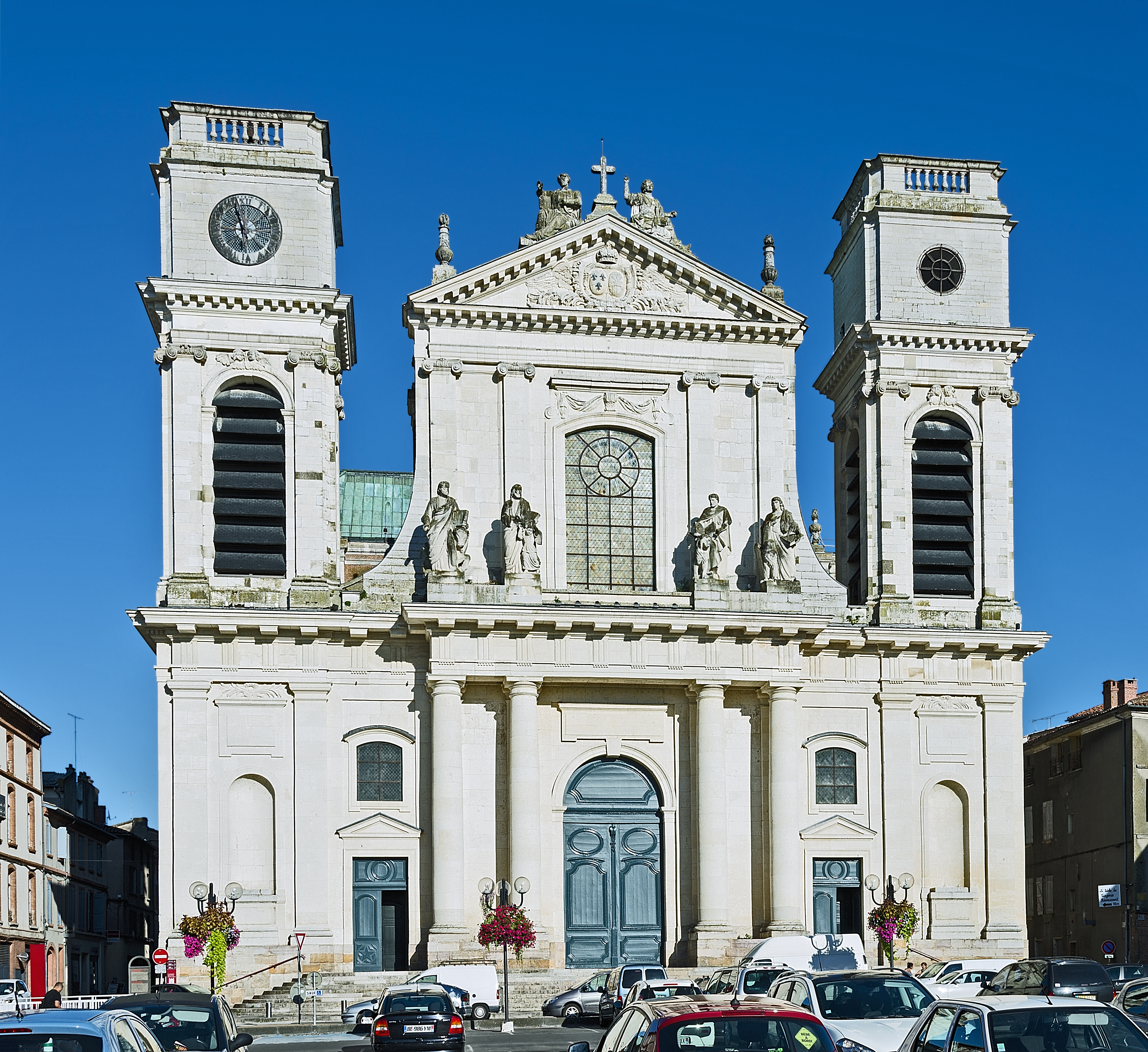
- Montauban Cathedral

Religion
- Affiliation: Roman Catholic
- Province: Bishopric of Montauban
- Region: Tarn-et-Garonne
- Ecclesiastical or organisational status: Cathedral
- Status: Active

Location
- Location: Montauban, France
- Interactive map of Montauban Cathedral; Cathédrale Notre-Dame-de-l'Assomption de Montauban

Architecture
- Type: church
- Groundbreaking: 1692

Montauban Cathedral (French: Cathédrale Notre-Dame-de-l'Assomption de Montauban) is a Roman Catholic cathedral and a national monument of France located in the town of Montauban.

It is the seat of the Bishopric of Montauban, created in 1317, abolished by the Concordat of 1801 and transferred to the Archdiocese of Toulouse, and restored in 1822.

The cathedral of Montauban was Protestant from the start of the Wars of Religion until Catholicism returned to Montauban in 1629.

The construction of a new church, the present building, was agreed after the revocation of the Edict of Nantes in 1685. The cornerstone of the new cathedral was laid in 1692, and the church was consecrated in 1739. Initially, the architect François d'Orbay supervised the works. When he died in 1697, he was succeeded by Jules Hardouin-Mansart and Robert de Cotte.

The towers frame the west façade, a pure product that applies all the conventions of classical art, i.e. an Ionic facade with a peristyle mounted by statues of the Four Evangelists which replaced the original statues. The interior is decorated with pilasters, metopes and triglyphs, and the cathedral's strict and elegant vertical lines make it a typical example of classical architecture. A famous painting by Ingres, "The Vow of Louis XIII", hangs in the north arm of the transept.

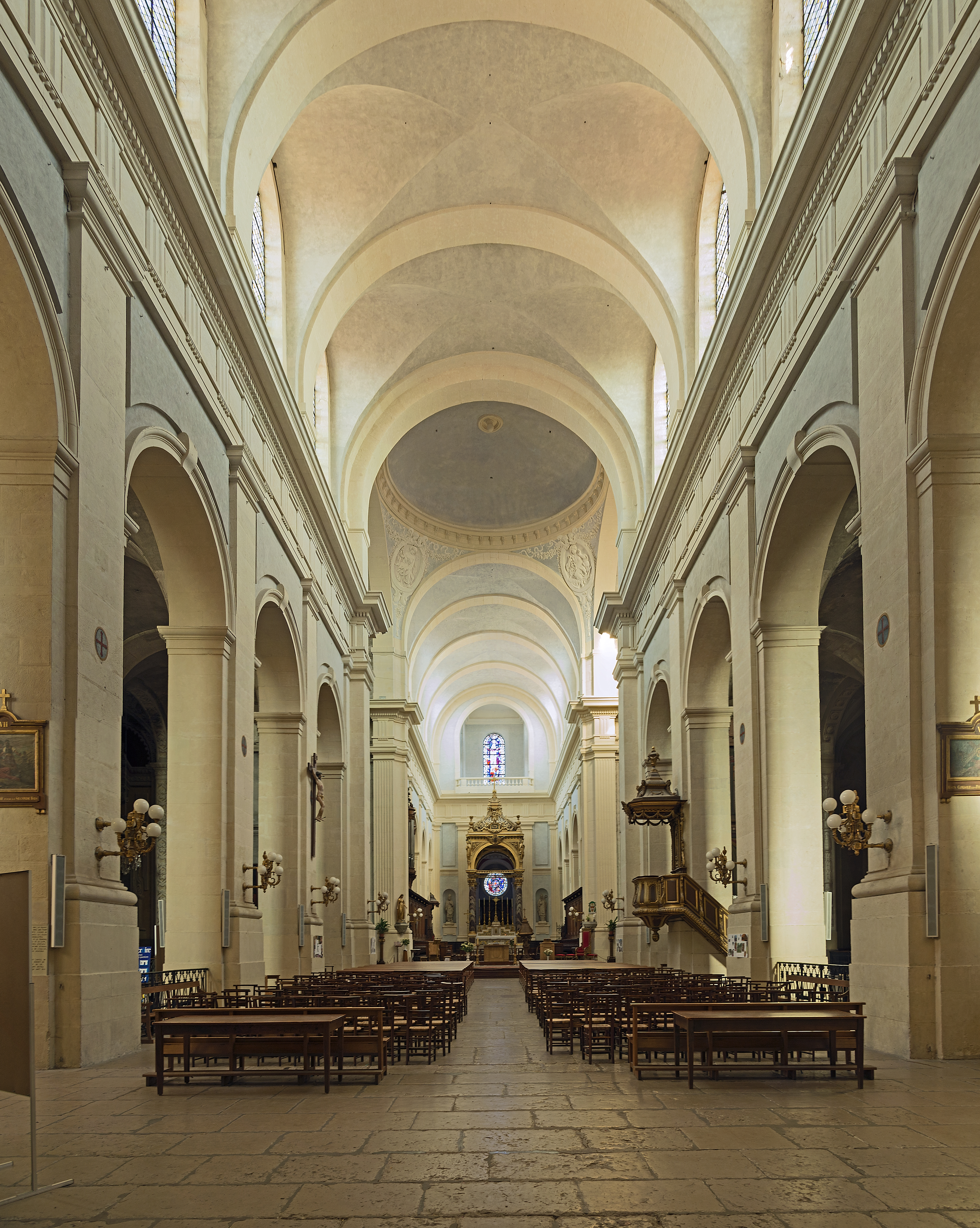
Interior view of Montauban Cathedral.

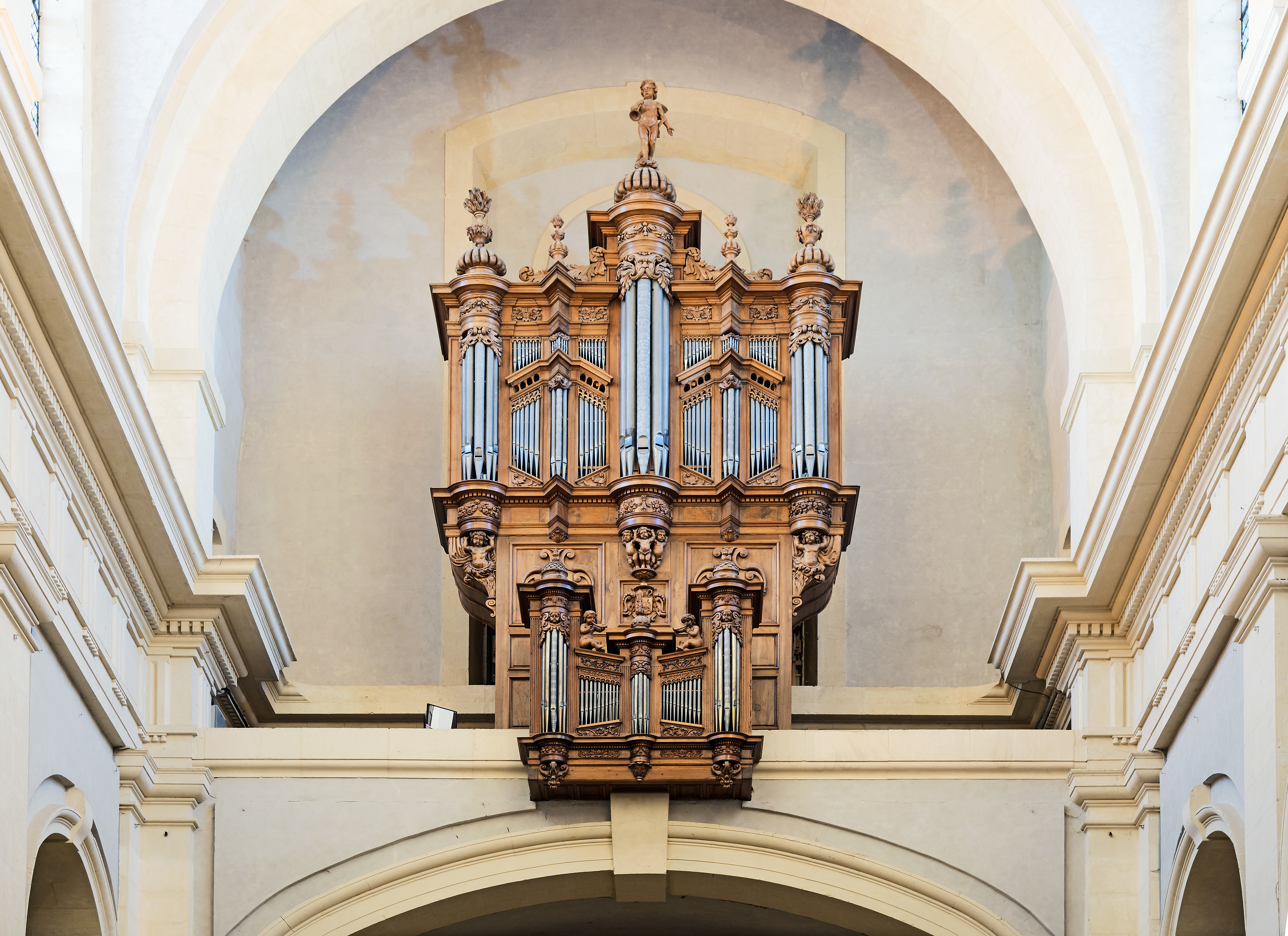
Organ

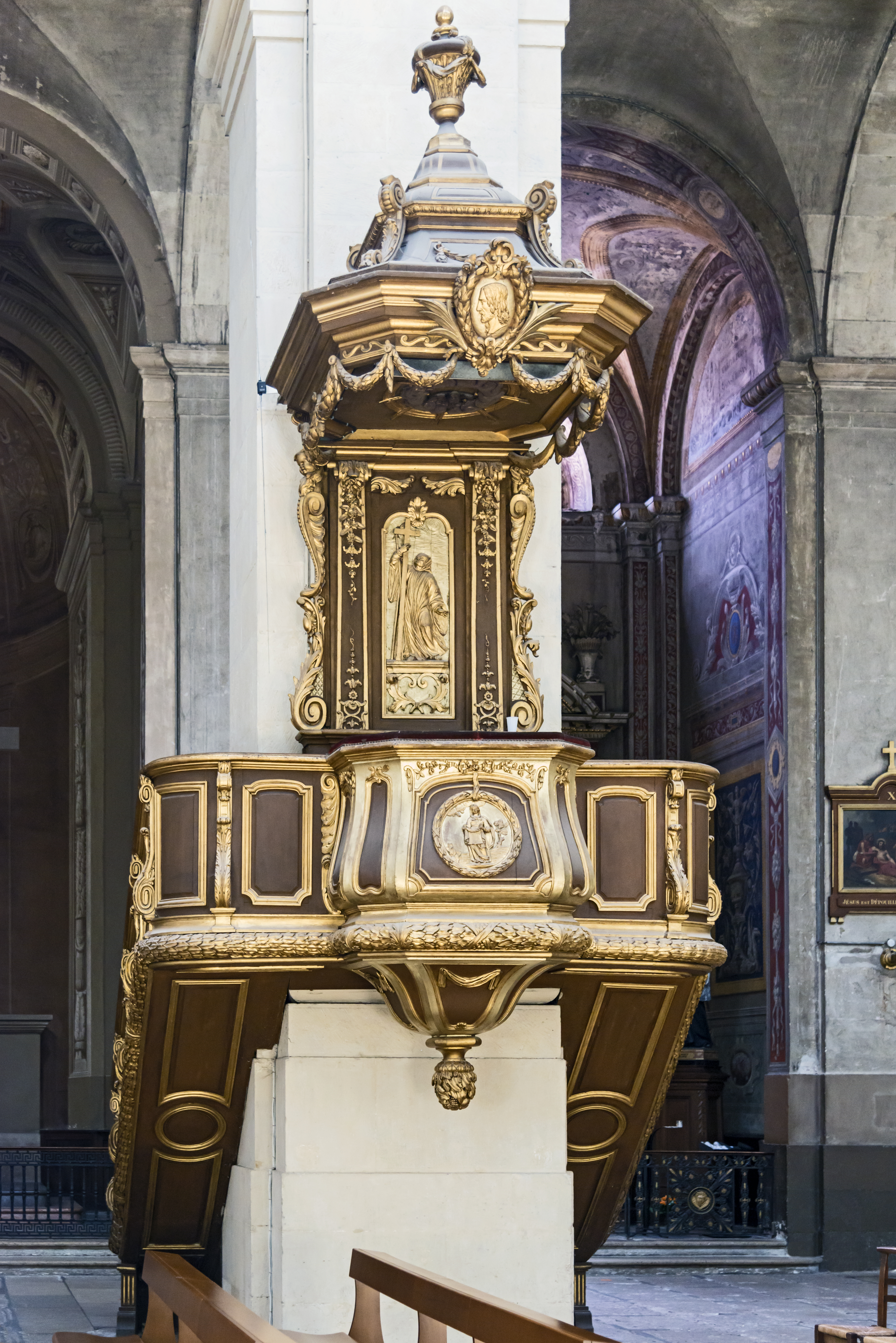
Pulpit

The Vow of Louis XIII by Ingres
