= Saturnine =

Saturnine can refer to:

- Relating to Saturn
- Saturnine antshrike (Thamnomanes saturninus), a species of bird
- The Saturnine, music group
- Saturnine Martial & Lunatic, a 1996 compilation album by Tears for Fears

== See also ==
- Saturnin
- Saturnina, Christian martyr
- Saturnyne, Marvel Comics character
- Saturnian (disambiguation)
- Saturnino (disambiguation)
- Saturninus (disambiguation)
- Saint-Saturnin (disambiguation)
- Saint Saturninus (disambiguation)
