= Saturninus =

Saturninus may refer to:

- Lucius Appuleius Saturninus (died 100 BC), tribune, legislator
- Gaius Sentius Saturninus, consul 19 BC, military officer, governor
- Marcus Aponius Saturninus (1st century AD), governor of Moesia, and partisan of first Vitellius, then Vespasian (emperors)
- Lucius Antonius Saturninus (79 AD), provincial governor and rebel against emperor Domitian
- Saturninus of Antioch (fl. 100–120), early gnostic
- Saturninus Empiricus, (c. 200 AD), Pyrrhonist philosopher and physician in the Empiric school of medicine. Student of Sextus Empiricus
- Saturninus (253-268), rebel against emperor Gallienus
- Julius Saturninus (died 280), provincial governor and rebel against emperor Probus
- Saturninus (consul 383), Roman consul in 383
- The Emperor in William Shakespeare's play Titus Andronicus

== See also ==
- Saint-Saturnin (disambiguation)
- Saint Saturninus (disambiguation)
- Saturnin
- Saturnina
- Saturnine (disambiguation)
- Saturnino (disambiguation)
