= Saint Salvius =

Saint Salvius may refer to

- Salvius of Albi (died 584), bishop of Albi in Francia
- Salvius of Amiens (died c. 615), 7th-century bishop of Amiens
