= Festival of San Fermín =

Annual festival in Pamplona, Spain

- Nickname: Sanfermín, Sanfermines, Sanferminak
- Begins: 6 July; 12:00 (CEST)
- Ends: 15 July; 00:00 (CEST)
- Frequency: Annual
- Locations: Pamplona, Navarre, Spain
- Major events: Running of the bulls
- Patron: Saint Fermín

Fiesta of International Tourist Interest
- Designated: 1980

The festival of San Fermín is a week-long, traditional celebration held annually in the city of Pamplona, Navarre, Spain. The celebrations start at noon on 6 July and continue until midnight on 14 July. A firework (chupinazo) starts the celebrations and the popular song Pobre de mí is sung at the end.

The most known event of the festival is the running of the bulls, which begins at 8 am each day on 7–14 July, but the festival involves many other traditional and folkloric events. It is known locally as Sanfermines in Spanish and Sanferminak in Basque and is held in honour of Saint Fermin, the co-patron of Navarre.

== History ==
=== Saint Fermín ===
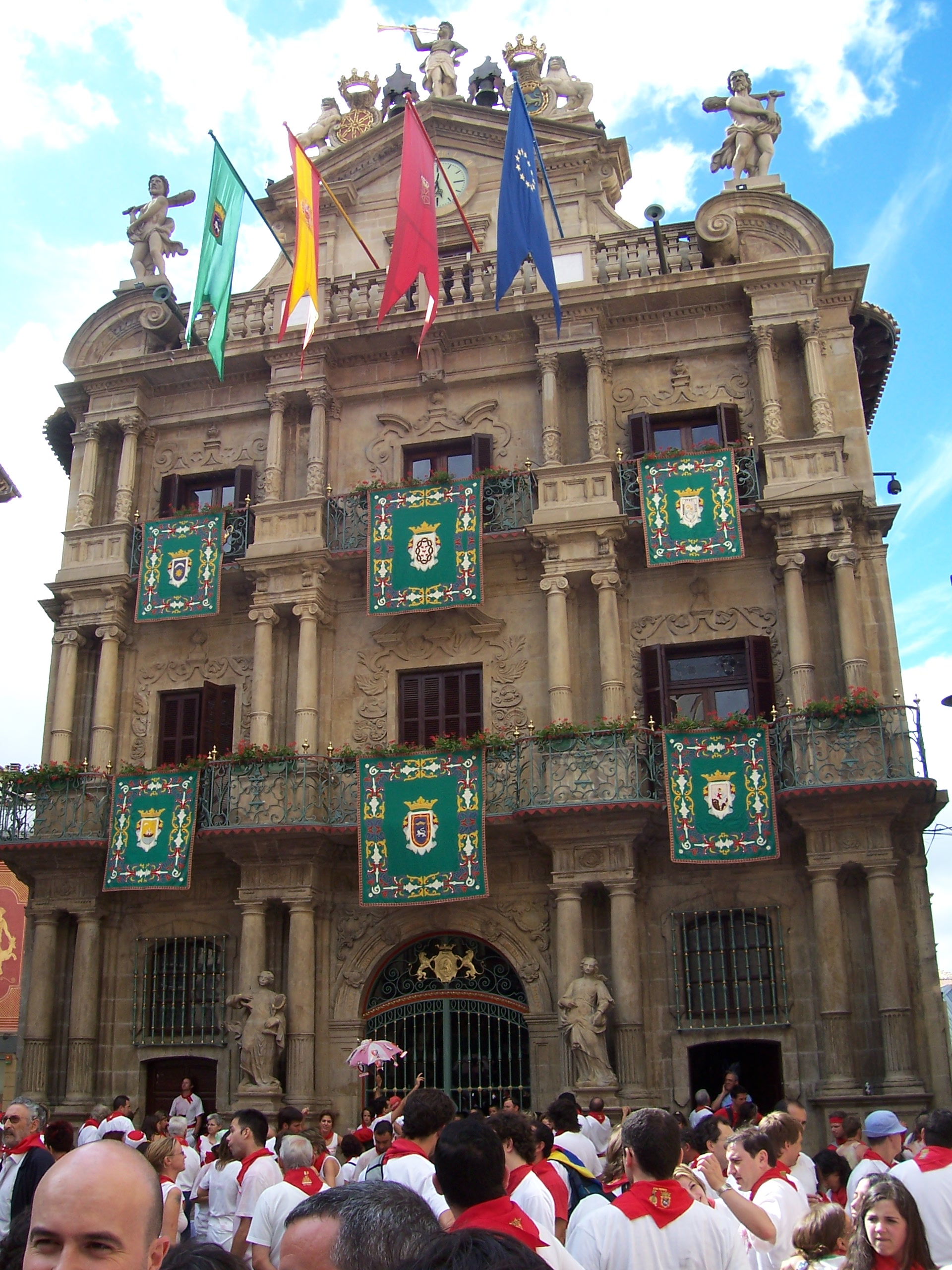
Facade of the City Council of Pamplona decorated for the San Fermín festivities

Fermín is said to have been the son of a Roman of senatorial rank in Pamplona in the 3rd century who was converted to Christianity by Saint Honestus, a disciple of Saint Saturninus. According to tradition, he was baptised by Saturninus (in Navarre, also known as Saint Cernin) at the spot now known as the Small Well of Saint Cernin. (Note: In Spanish: Pocico de San Cernin) Fermín returned to Pamplona as its first bishop. On a later preaching voyage, Fermín was dragged to death; and is now considered a martyr in the Catholic Church. It is believed that he died on September 25, 303. There is no written record of veneration of the Saint in Pamplona until the 12th century.

The celebration of the festival has its origins in the combination of two different medieval events. Commercial secular fairs were held at the beginning of the summer. As cattle merchants came into town with their animals, eventually bullfighting came to be organised as a part of the tradition. These were first documented in the 14th century. Religious ceremonies honouring the saint were held on October 10, but in 1591, they were transferred to July 7 to coincide with the fair, when Pamplona's weather was better. This is considered to be the beginning of the Sanfermines.

During medieval times, the acts included an opening speech, musicians, tournaments, theatre, bullfights, dances or fireworks. Bullrunning appeared in the 17th century, together with the presence of foreigners and the first concerns about excessive drinking and dissolute behaviour during the event. The Parade of Giants (Note: In Spanish: Comparsa de Gigantes y Cabezudos) was created in the mid-19th century. The first official bullring was constructed in 1844.

=== Modern times ===
Monument to Hemingway outside the bullring in Pamplona

The fame and the number of foreign visitors it receives every year are related to the description in Ernest Hemingway's book The Sun Also Rises (Note: Also known as Fiesta, which in Spanish means party or carnival) and the reports he made as a journalist. He first visited in 1923 and returned many times until 1959.

Televisión Española (TVE) broadcasts the event live nationwide and internationally on television. Its national radio broadcasters are Radio Nacional and Cadena SER.

The festival was cancelled in 2020 and 2021 due to the COVID-19 pandemic.

== One-day events ==
=== Chupinazo ===
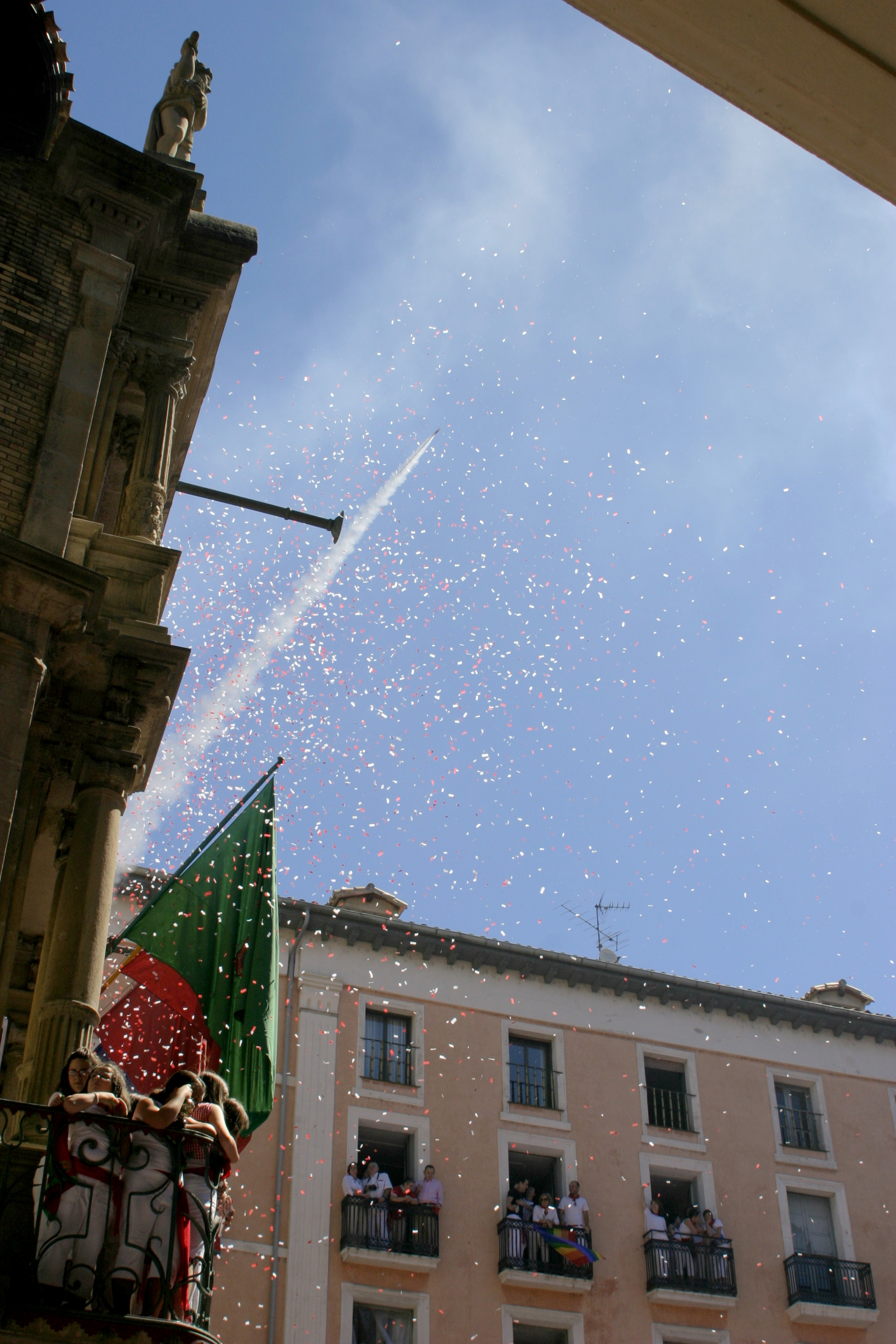
Chupinazo sets off

The opening of the festival is marked by setting off the firework chupinazo (or txupinazo in Basque). The rocket was launched at 12:00 noon on 6 July from a city hall balcony, with people celebrating the act in the city hall square and other locations in Pamplona. The chupinazo marked the beginning of the fiesta since 1941. The person who sets it off is decided by the city mayor.

Since 1979, the tradition has been that each year after city elections, the chupinazo is set off by a person from the different city council political groups, starting with the mayor and then political groups ordered by number of representatives. There have been exceptions to this tradition with some non-politicians being in charge of the act when they had performed significant achievements during the year. Examples of these exceptions were a player of the local football team or the president of the "giants and big-heads" group on its 150th years anniversary. Following the rocket firing, a pipe band playing percussion and txistus played amongst the crowds and then marched off the main square.

=== Riau-Riau ===
The Riau-Riau was a mass activity held on 6 July. The members of the city council parade from the City Hall to a nearby chapel dedicated to Saint Fermín with participants dancing to the Astrain Waltz along the way. The ritual was introduced in 1911 by Ignacio Baleztena Ascárate. The procession was removed from the festival calendar in 1992 for the sake of public order, as political activists used the "Riau-Riau" to promote clashes with authorities.

Protesting youths had sometimes blocked the way, and it often took up to five hours for the city councilors to walk the 500 meters to the Saint Fermin chapel. Nevertheless, in recent years, it has been held unofficially without the participation of the members of the city council. In 1996 and 2012, there were two failed attempts to restore the original act with the participation of the city council, both of which were cancelled due to violent clashes with some participants.

=== Saint Fermín procession ===
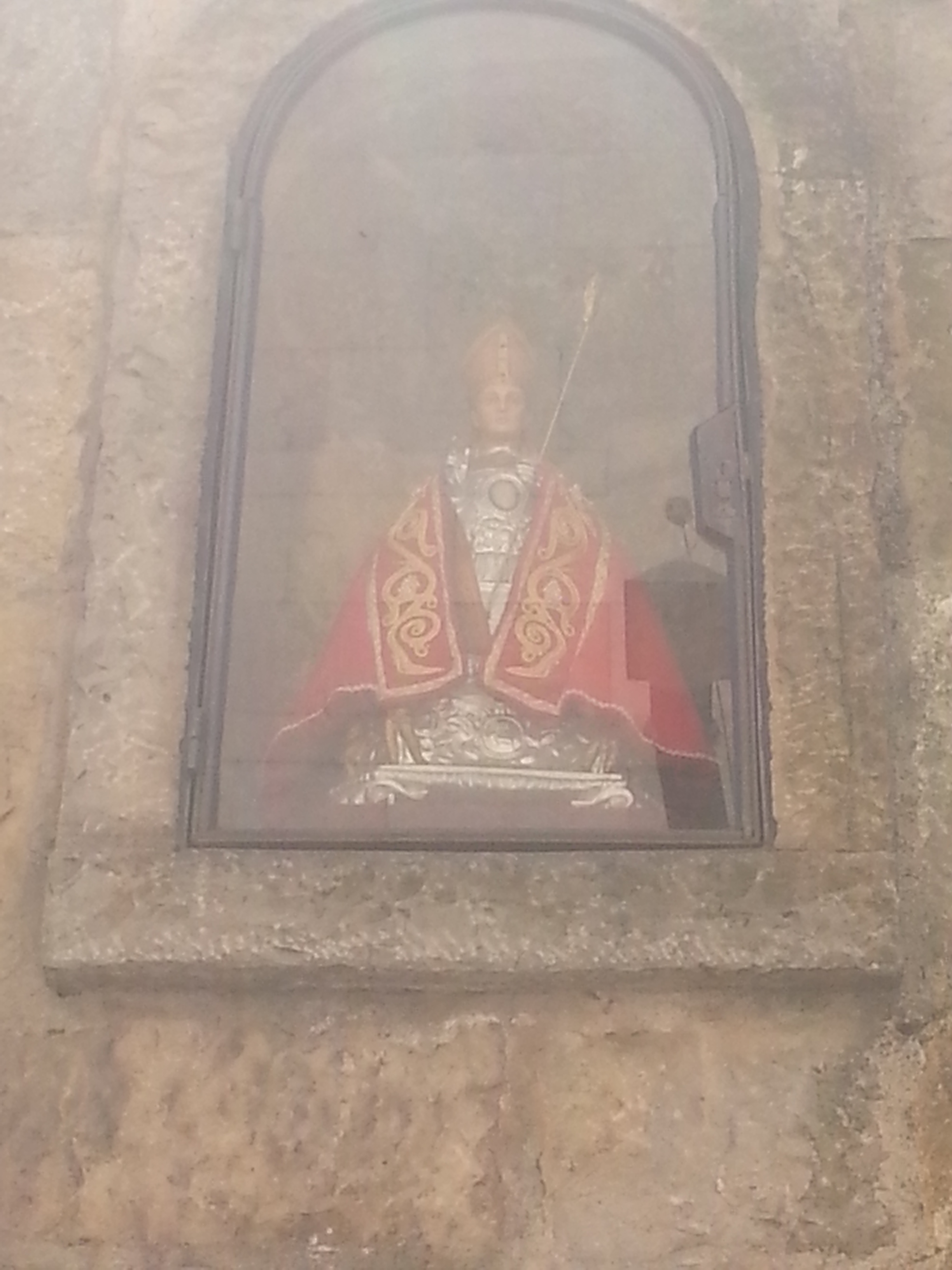
Hornacina of the Saint, located on the slope of Santo Domingo

The key day of the festival is July 7 when people accompany the 15th-century statue of Saint Fermin through the old part of Pamplona. The statue is accompanied by dancers and street entertainers, as well as different political and religious authorities including the city mayor and the Bishop of Pamplona, who leads High Mass before the event.

During procession, a Jota (an ancient traditional dance) is performed for the saint, a rose is offered in the Saint Fermin well, and the gigantes (enormous wood-framed and papier-mâché puppet figures managed from inside) dance while the cathedral bell named María (Mary) peals. Mass is held in the city cathedral, as well as in city parishes.

=== Struendo ===
El Struendo ("The Roar" (Note: In Spanish the correct spelling would be Estruendo. However, the name is intentionally misspelled.)) is an event which has been a tradition since at least 1975. It is purposely not part of the official program; each year, it occurs on a different day of the festival and usually a weekday to reduce crowd size. People gather at 23:59 at City Hall and make as much noise as possible for several hours, using noisemakers that include drums, cymbals, bowls, whistles, and pans.

=== Pobre de mí ===
After nine days of partying, the people of Pamplona meet in the City Hall Plaza at midnight on July 14, singing the traditional notes of the Pobre de mí ('Poor Me'). The city mayor then closes the festival with participants lighting a candle and removing their red handkerchiefs as the song is played by the local band, followed by a fireworks display at the city hall. This closing ceremony tradition, which marks the official close of the festivities, started out in the 1920s.

== Daily events ==
=== Running of the bulls ===
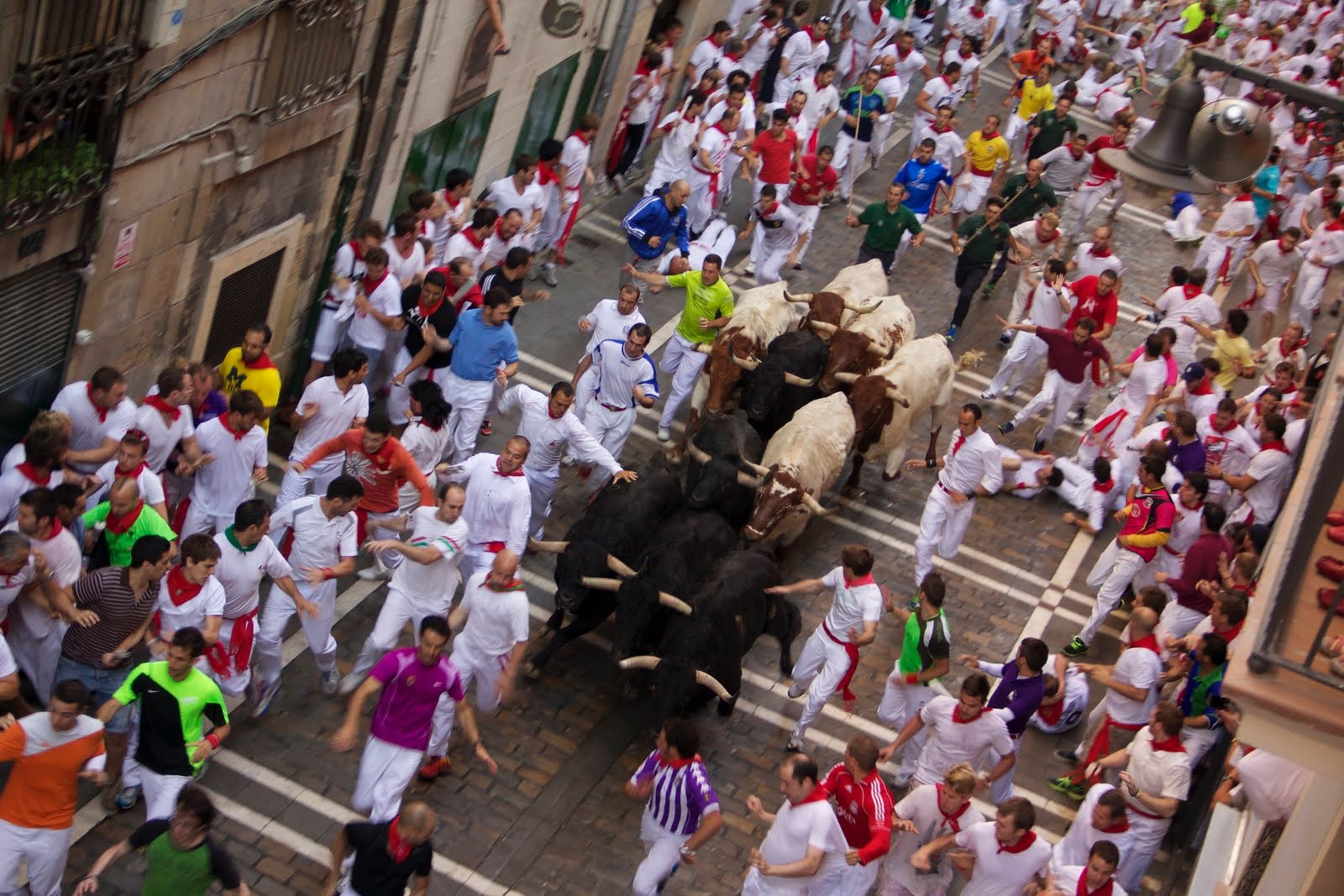
Running of the bulls on Estafeta Street

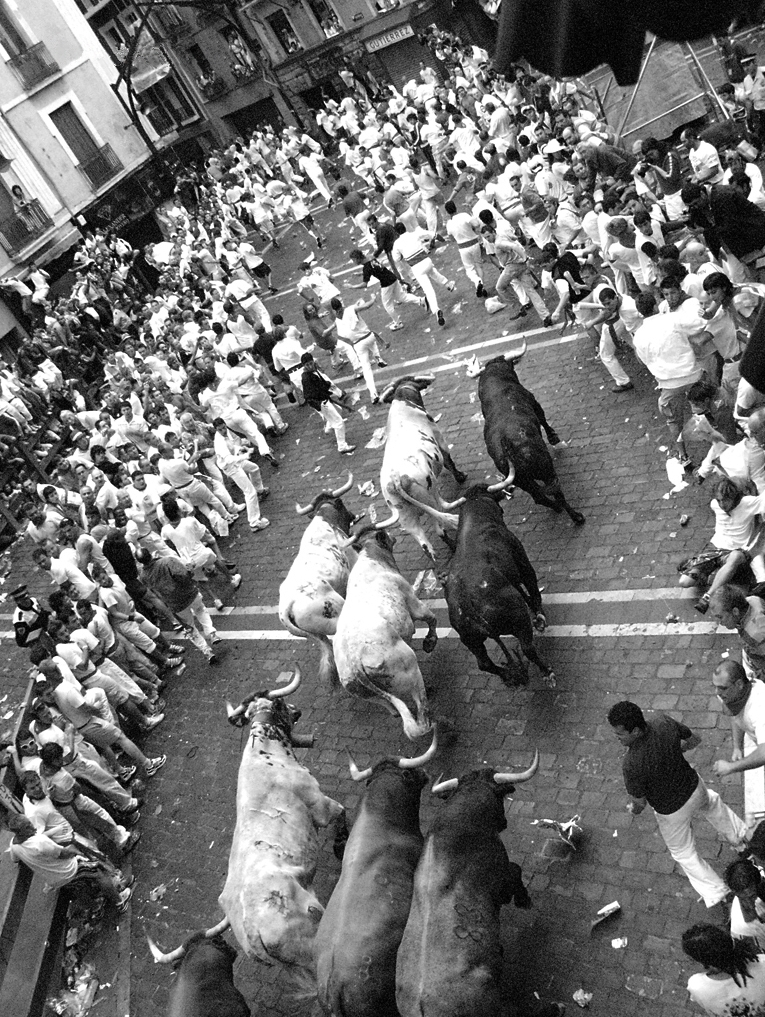
Confinement as it passes through the town hall square

The running of the bulls (Spanish: encierro or los toros de san Fermin (Note: From the verb encerrar (to lock/shut))) involves hundreds of people running in front of six bulls and another six steers down an 825-metre (2,707-foot) stretch of narrow streets of a section of Pamplona. The run ends in Pamplona's bullring. Bullruns are held between 7 and 14 July; a different encaste (sub-breed) of bull appears on each day of the festival. The event begins at 8 o'clock in the morning. A firecracker's report announces the release of the bulls from their corral. Before the year 1924, it started at 6 o'clock; it was at 7 o'clock between 1924 and 1974. Runners gather earlier at the beginning of the itinerary to ask for the protection of the saint by singing a chant three times before a small statue of San Fermín which has been placed in a raised niche in a wall, in both Spanish and Basque:

A San Fermín pedimos, por ser nuestro patrón, nos guíe en el encierro, dándonos su bendición.
Entzun, arren, San Fermin zu zaitugu patroi, zuzendu gure oinak entzierro hontan otoi.
(To San Fermin, we ask to be our patron saint and to guide us in the running of the bulls, giving us his blessing.)

Viva San Fermin and Gora San Fermin are shouted following the chant. While the chant since 1962 has been sung in Spanish, beginning in 2009, a Basque translation is sung after it.

A second firecracker signals that the last bull has left the corral. There are six fighting bulls, accompanied by six oxen (often white- and brown-coloured) that guide them to the plaza, followed by three more non-fighting oxen. Shepherds guide the bulls. Once all of the bulls have entered the arena, a third firecracker is released. A fourth firecracker indicates that the bulls are in their bullpens and the run has concluded.

Since 1925, 15 people have been killed during the event—most recently on 10 July 2009—and every year, between 200 and 300 people are injured during the run, although most injuries are non-lethal contusions due to falls.

=== Giants and big-heads parade ===
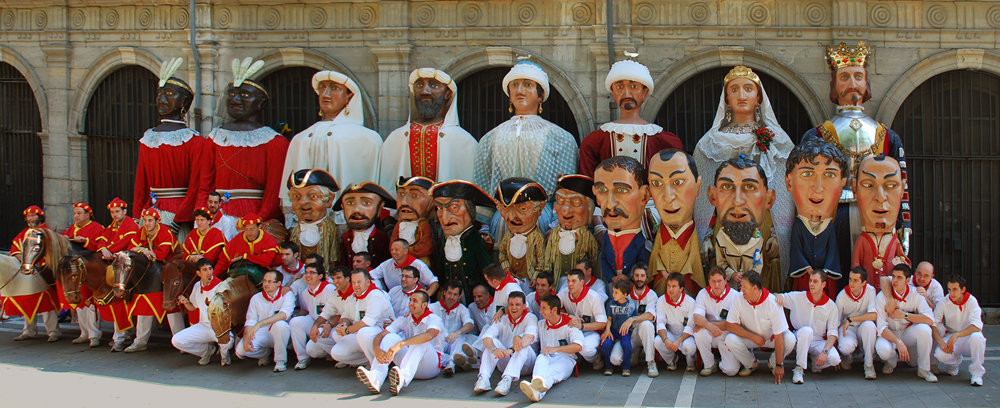
Pamplona's Giants and big-heads parade. From back to front and left to right: American, Asian, African, and European pairs of giants (last row), the six kilikis, the five big-heads (second row), the zaldikos, and members of the parade who carry the figures (front row).

Each morning of the festival, a parade of gigantes y cabezudos (English: "giants and big-heads") occurs. Eight giant figures, more than 150 years old, are carried by a dancer inside a wooden structure. These figures were built in 1860 by Tadeo Amorena, a painter from Pamplona. They represent four pairs of kings and queens of four different races and places (Europe, Asia, America, and Africa). Their height is approximately 4 m (13 ft). During the parade, the giants dance to the rhythm of traditional music.

An additional 17 figures are in the parade: six kilikis, five big-heads, and six zaldikos. These were built between 1860 and 1941. Kilikis and big-heads are human caricatures that are carried as helmets. Big-heads are up to 1 m (3 ft 3 in) tall; kilikis are slightly smaller. Zaldikos are figures that represent horses with their riders. The big-heads precede the giants and wave their hands at spectators. Kilikis and zaldikos run after children, hitting them with a foam truncheon.

=== Traditional sports ===
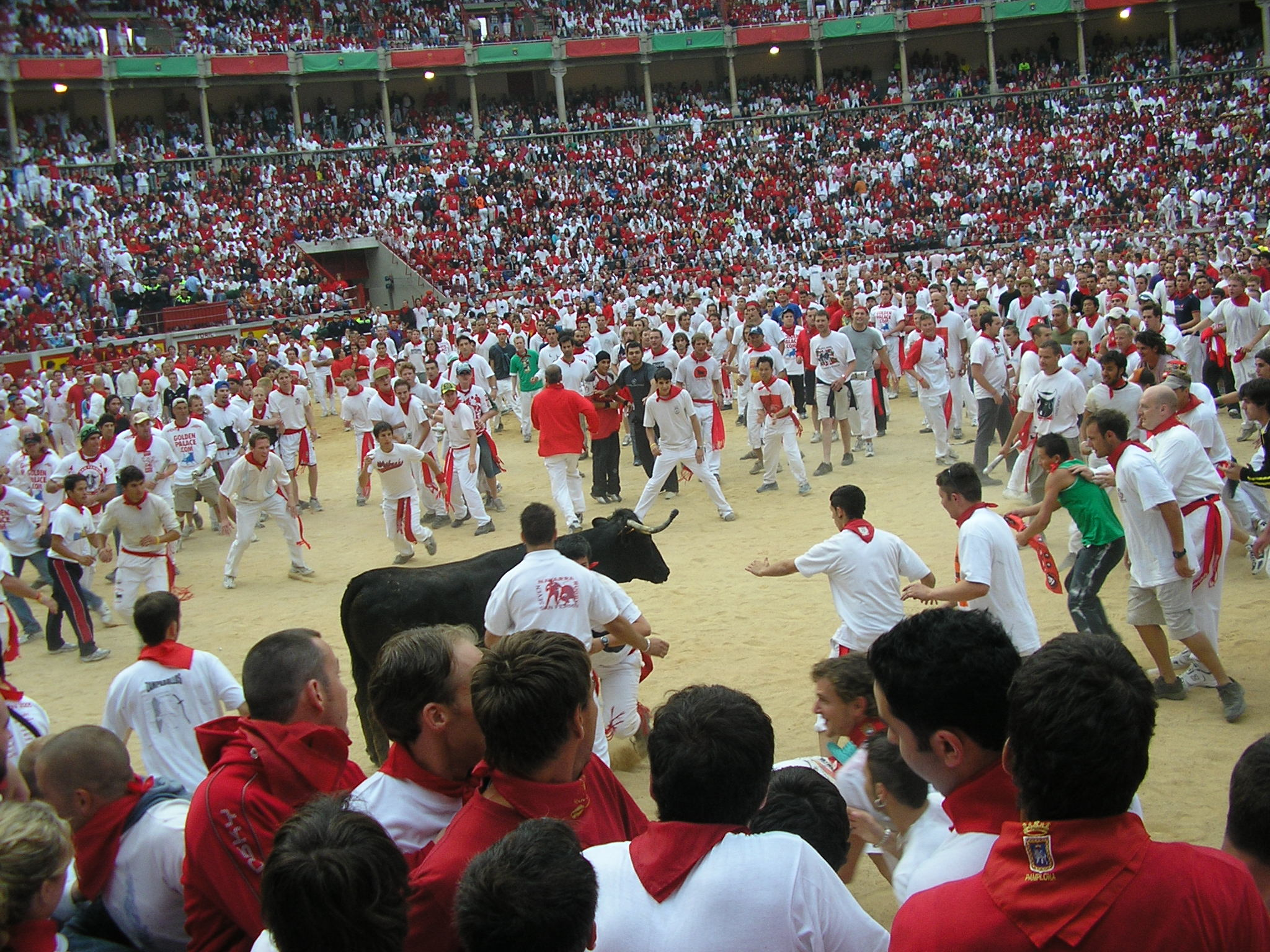
Pamplona bullring

There are exhibitions and competitions of Basque rural sports every morning in the Plaza de los Fueros, a square close to the city citadel, although they were formerly held in the bullring. Sports include stone lifting, wood cutting, or hay bale lifting. On the other hand, the Jai alai tournament of Sanfermin is a prestigious competition for this variety of basque pelota. It is held in one of the courts of the city. Betting is common during these events.

=== Bullfight ===
Every afternoon from July 7 to 14, there is a bullfight in which the 6 bulls that have been driven to the bullring during the bullrunning of that day are killed. It begins at 18:00. In addition, the fifth bullfight with younger bulls and not fully trained bullfighters is performed while the sixth features bullfighters on horses (Spanish: rejoneo).

The circuit has only changed slightly since 1852, as the former bullring was located close to the present one. Before that date, the bullrunning ended in the "castle plaza". While the origin of this tradition was the necessity to move the bulls from outside the city to the bullring for the bullfight, it is not clear when citizens began to run in front of them. There are written records from 1787 indicating that the tradition was already well established with no memory of its beginning. The tradition of singing for protection from the saint dates back to 1962.

=== Fireworks ===
Every night at 23:00, a fireworks spectacle is held at the citadel park. Fireworks spectacles have been known to occur in Sanfermin as far back as 1595. From 2000 to 2019 and since 2022, an international fireworks contest has been held. Participants watch them while seated on the grass around the citadel.

== See also ==
- Fiestas of International Tourist Interest of Spain
