= Saint Saturninus =

Saint Saturninus may refer to:

- Saturninus (died c. 203), companion of Saints Perpetua and Felicity, martyred in Carthage, feast day: 7 March
- Saturnin of Toulouse (died c. 257), first bishop of Toulouse, France, feast day: 29 November
- Saturninus (died c. 303), name of four of the Martyrs of Zaragoza, feast day: 16 April
- Saturninus (died 304), one of the Martyrs of Abitina, feast day: 12 February
- Saturninus of Cagliari (died c. 304), martyred in Sardinia, feast day: 30 October
- Saturninus the Martyr (died 304), martyred in north-west Africa with nine unnamed companions, feast day: 22 March
- Saturninus of Carthage (died 304), martyred in Rome, feast day: 29 November
- Saturninus, one of the Seven Robbers martyred on Corfu in the 2nd century

== See also ==
- Saturninus (disambiguation)
- Saint-Saturnin (disambiguation)
- Saturnina, Christian virgin martyr
- Sant Sadurní (disambiguation)
