= Sant Sadurní =

Sant Sadurní may refer to:

== People ==
- Saint Saturnin

== Places in Catalonia ==
- Sant Sadurní d'Anoia
- Sant Sadurní de l'Heura, in the municipality of Cruïlles, Monells i Sant Sadurní de l'Heura
- Sant Sadurní d'Osormort
- Sant Sadurní de Rotgers, in the municipality of Borredà

== See also ==
- Saint Saturninus (disambiguation)
