= Saint-Sernin =

Saint-Sernin is another form of Saturnin, the first bishop of Toulouse who died c. 257 AD.

It may also refer to the following places in France:

- Basilica of Saint-Sernin, Toulouse, the basilica of Toulouse, France
- Saint-Sernin, Ardèche, a commune in the department of Ardèche
- Saint-Sernin, Aude, a commune in the department of Aude
- Saint-Sernin, Lot-et-Garonne, a commune in the department of Lot-et-Garonne
- Saint-Sernin-du-Bois, a commune in the department of Saône-et-Loire
- Saint-Sernin-du-Plain, a commune in the department of Saône-et-Loire
- Saint-Sernin-lès-Lavaur, a commune in the department of Tarn
- Saint-Sernin-sur-Rance, a commune in the department of Aveyron

== See also ==
- Saint-Saturnin (disambiguation)
