= Fermin =

Spanish saint

Saint Fermin
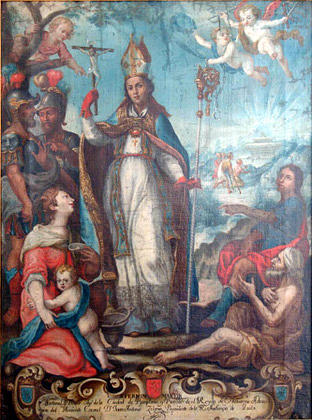
- Saint Fermin, depicted in an eighteenth-century oil painting

Bishop and Martyr
- Born: Pamplona, Spain
- Died: Amiens, France
- Venerated in: Eastern Orthodox Church; Roman Catholic Church
- Feast: 25 September; 7 July in Pamplona, Spain
- Patronage: Amiens, France, Lesaka, Spain, Navarre, Spain.

Fermin (also Firmin, from Latin Firminus; Spanish Fermín) was a holy man and martyr, traditionally venerated as the co-patron saint of Navarre, Spain. He was born in the mid 3rd century, so his death may be associated with the Diocletianic Persecution (303).

Although he is said to have lived in the third century, the first texts we have about saint Fermin date back to the ninth century. It may originate in the diocese of Toulouse, which endeavoured to spread the devotion to Saint Fermin. His tombstone is one of the elements that helped to convey his memory.

According to the legend, a senator from Pamplona named Firmus was converted to Christianity by Honestus and persuaded Saturnin of Toulouse to come to Pamplona to baptise him. There the bishop preached to large crowds and baptised some 40,000 people over three days. Firmus's son, Firminus (Fermin), was entrusted to Honestus for his Christian education and at age 31 went to Toulouse to be consecrated by Saturninus's successor, Honoratus. Fermin then went to preach in northern Gaul, where he became associated with the city of Amiens. He was persecuted and ultimately martyred.

Fermin's feast is celebrated in Pamplona with a series of festivities, the Sanfermines, including the famous Running of the Bulls. He is also venerated at Amiens.

== Legend ==
Fermin is said to have been the son of Eugenia and Firmo, a Roman of senatorial rank in Pamplona in the 3rd century. Fermin was converted to Christianity by Honestus, a disciple of Saturnin. According to tradition, he was baptised by Saturninus (in Navarra "San Cernin") at the spot now known as the Pocico de San Cernin (the "Small Well of San Cernin"), across from the Church of San Cernin which is built on the foundations of a pagan temple.

Saturninus was the first bishop of Toulouse, where he was sent during the "consulate of Decius and Gratus" (AD 250). He was martyred (traditionally in 257 AD), significantly by being tied to a bull by his feet and dragged to his death, a martyrdom that is sometimes transferred to Fermin. In Toulouse, the earliest church, dedicated to Notre-Dame du Taur ("Our Lady of the Bull"), still exists, though rebuilt. Though the 11th century Basilica of Saint-Sernin, the largest surviving Romanesque structure in France, has superseded it, the church is said to be built where the bull stopped. More likely, it was built on a site previously dedicated to a pre-Christian sacred bull, perhaps the bull of Mithras. The street, which runs straight from the Capitole, is named not the Rue de Notre-Dame but the Rue du Taur. San Cernin (Saturnin) is the patron saint of Pamplona.

Fermin was ordained a priest in Toulouse, according to the local legend, and returned to Pamplona as its first bishop. Some years later, he preached the gospel through Aquitania, Auvernia and Anjou, before settling in Amiens, France, where he was also named Bishop of Amiens. The local authorities in Amiens had him imprisoned and later beheaded. He died on 25 September, AD 303.

In Legenda aurea several miracles attended the discovery and translation of the relics of Saint Fermin in the time of Salvius, bishop of Amiens (traditionally c. 600). According to the legend, a sweet odor arose from his grave, which caused ice and snow to melt, flowers to grow, the sick to be cured, and trees to be inclined reverently toward the saint.

== Veneration ==
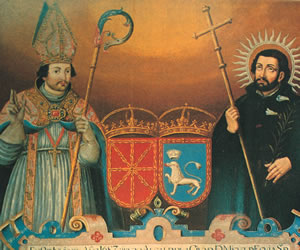
Baroque-era depiction of Saint Fermin (left) and Saint Francis Xavier, principal co-patrons of the Kingdom of Navarre. The coat of arms of Navarre and Pamplona are also visible.

The Abbey of Saint-Acheul in Amiens was founded in 1085 on the supposed tomb of Fermin. Under the choir of the abbey's church there is a vault in the place where the body of Fermin was miraculously discovered. According to legend the place of the body was revealed to Bishop Salvius of Amiens, who arranged to have it carried to Amiens Cathedral. The veneration of Saint Fermin was of great religious and economic importance to Amiens during the Middle Ages and into modern times. Legends grew up to explain the discovery of the saint's relics, most of which were held at Amiens. He is represented in a number of major works of art in Amiens Cathedral. When certain relics of the saint were brought back to Pamplona in 1196, the city decided to mark the occasion with an annual event. Over the centuries, the saint's festival, the ancient annual fair and the running of the bulls and subsequent bullfights have all melded together.

Besides Pamplona, Fermín is venerated in other places in Navarre, such as Lesaka, in the fiesta called the Regata del Bidasoa. In the basilica of San Fermín de Aldapa, the martyrdom of Saint Fermin is still commemorated on 25 September. On the preceding Thursday to Sunday there are numerous festivities there, in the Navarrería (a neighbourhood of Pamplona) and near the Cathedral. Celebrations begin with a firework rocket set off by a youngster from the Navarrería, who has been given the title of the little mayor. As at Pamplona, the celebrations have a special closing ceremony called Pobre de mí (Poor Me).

There is a mysterious well of an otherwise unknown "Saint Farmin" at Bowes, Yorkshire, England. The existence of a monastery named after a Saint Firmin in North Crawley was recorded in the Domesday Book (i.149a); there was a holy well in the churchyard, and unauthorized pilgrimages there were suppressed in 1298. The church at Thurlby, Lincs, is dedicated to St Firmin. The only other St. Firmin in England rested at Thorney, Cambridgeshire. These occurrences point towards possible veneration of Firmin in Anglo-Saxon England.

The San Fermin festival is celebrated in Pamplona, in the region of Navarre, every year from the 6 to 14 July. It has become internationally known because of the running of the bulls, where the bulls are led through the streets of the old quarter as far as the bull ring by runners. The fiestas are celebrated in honor of Fermin, co-patron saint of Navarra, although the religious aspect would seem to have taken on a secondary role over the last number of years.

== Gallery ==
The funeral monument of Adrien de Henencourt, head of the chapter of Amiens Cathedral in the early 16th century, depicts not only the life and martyrdom of the saint, but also the posthumous history of his body, in a series of polychrome reliefs and statuary.

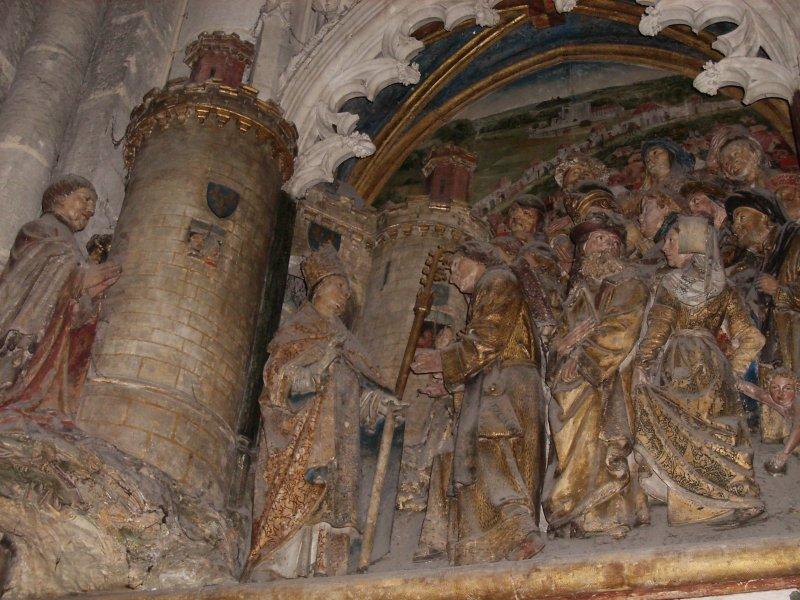
St Firmin enters Amiens.

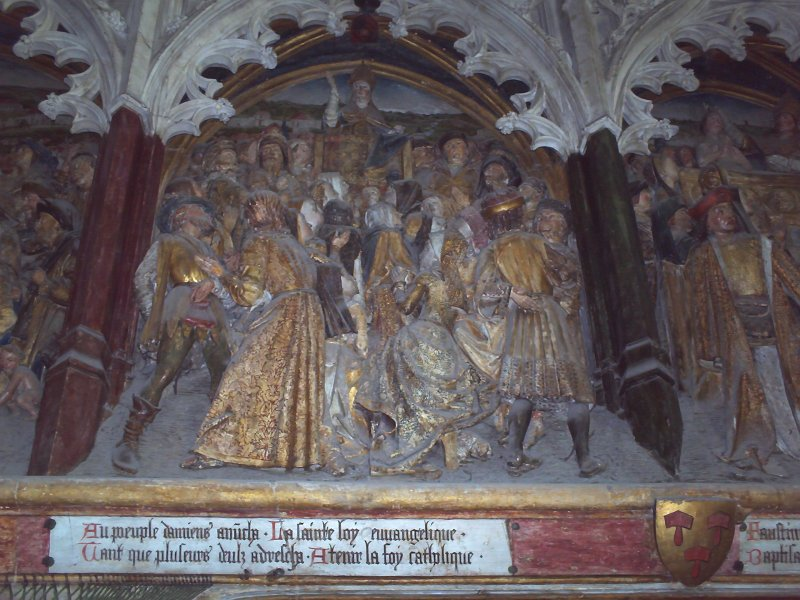
St Firmin proclaims the gospel.

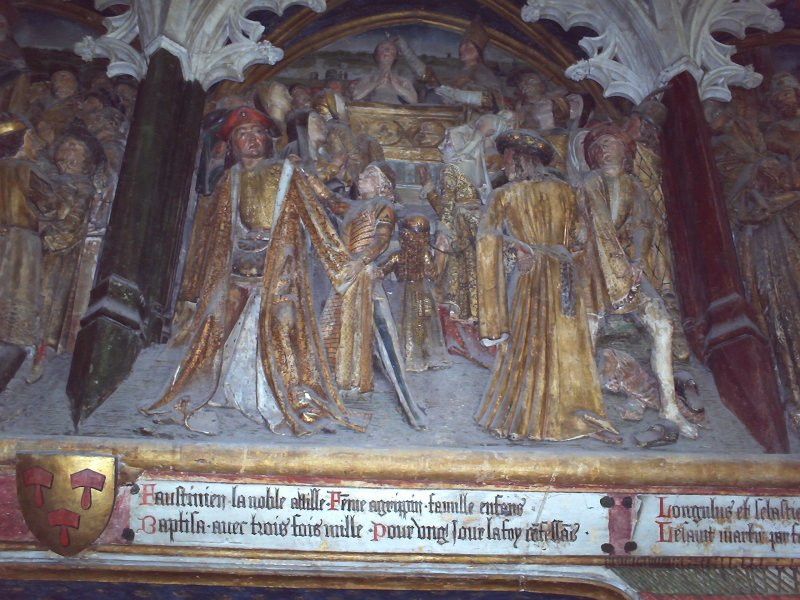
St Firmin baptises converts.

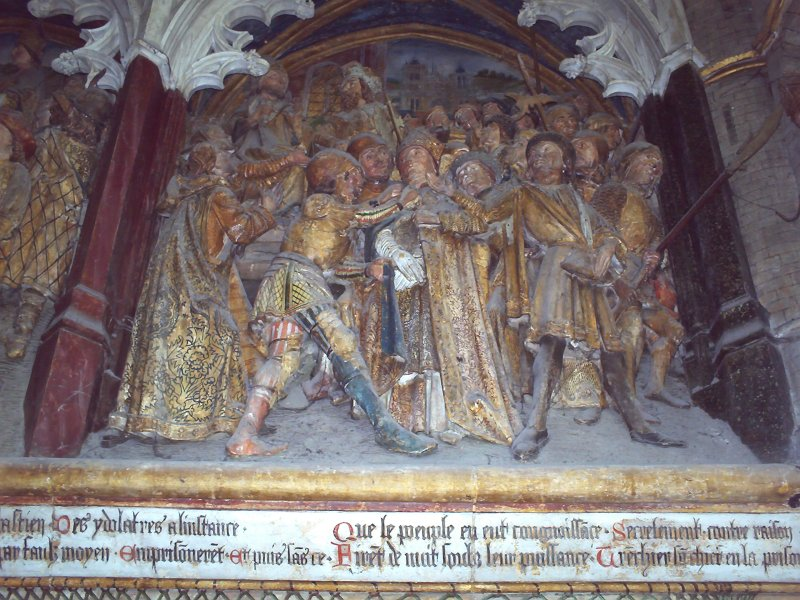
St Firmin is arrested.

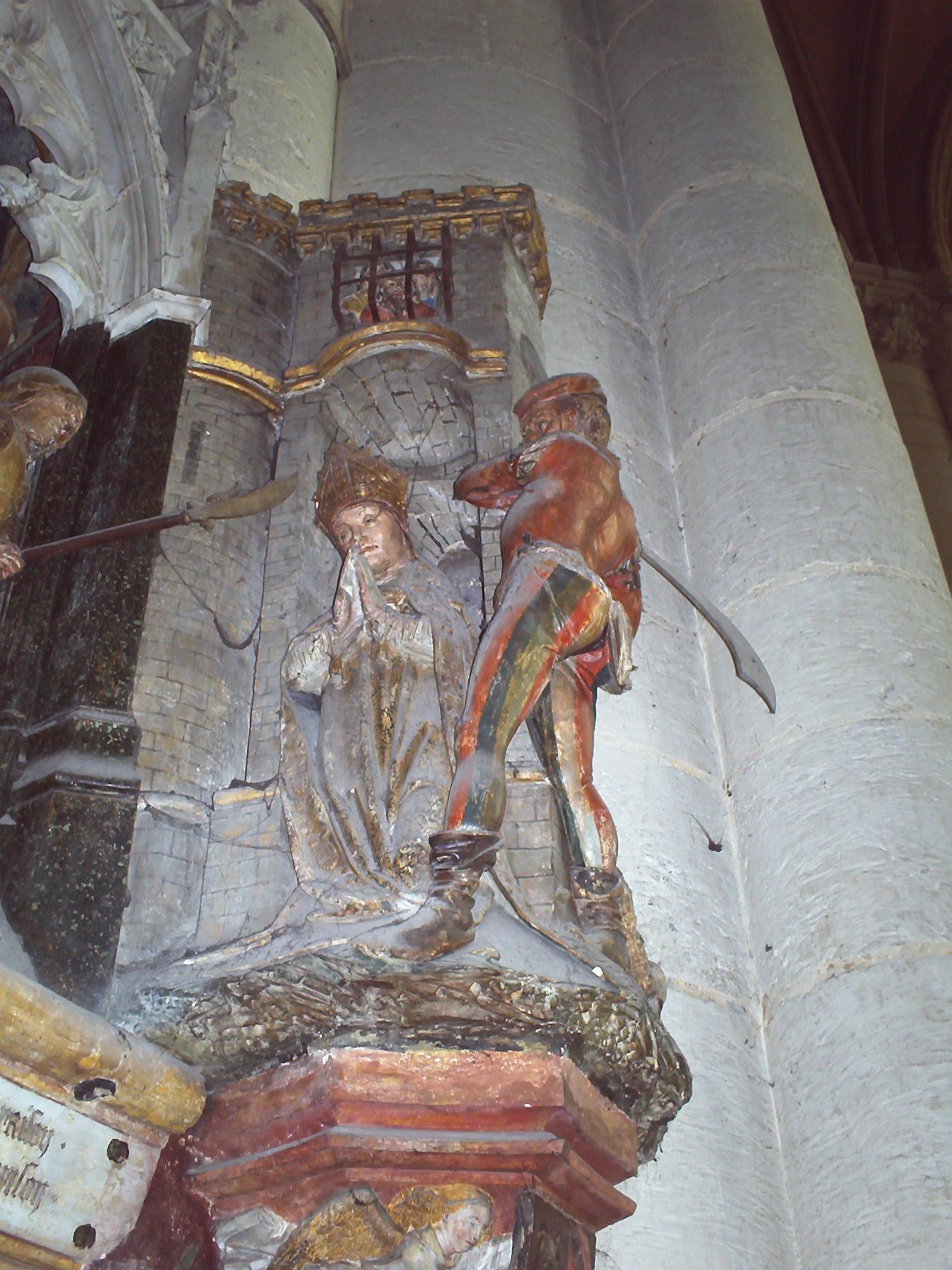
Decapitation of St Firmin.

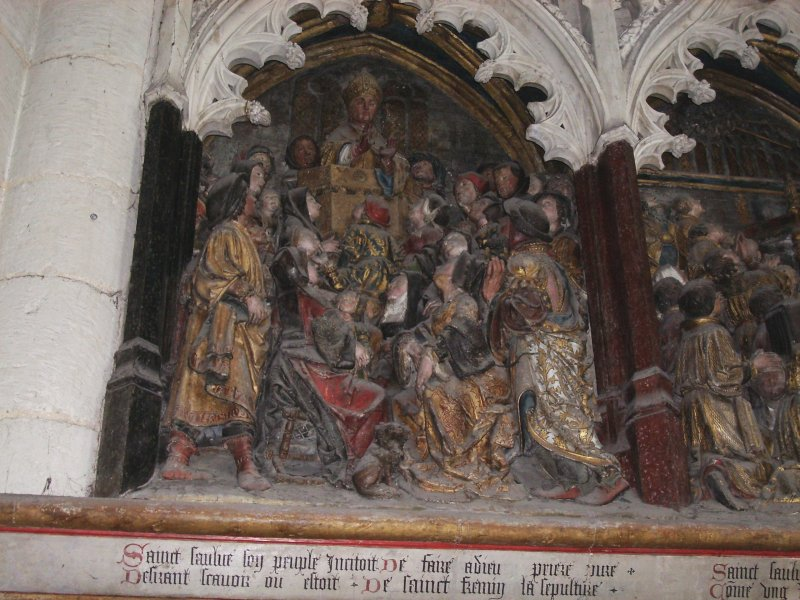
The discovery of St Firmin's body is predicted by Saint Sauve, a later bishop.

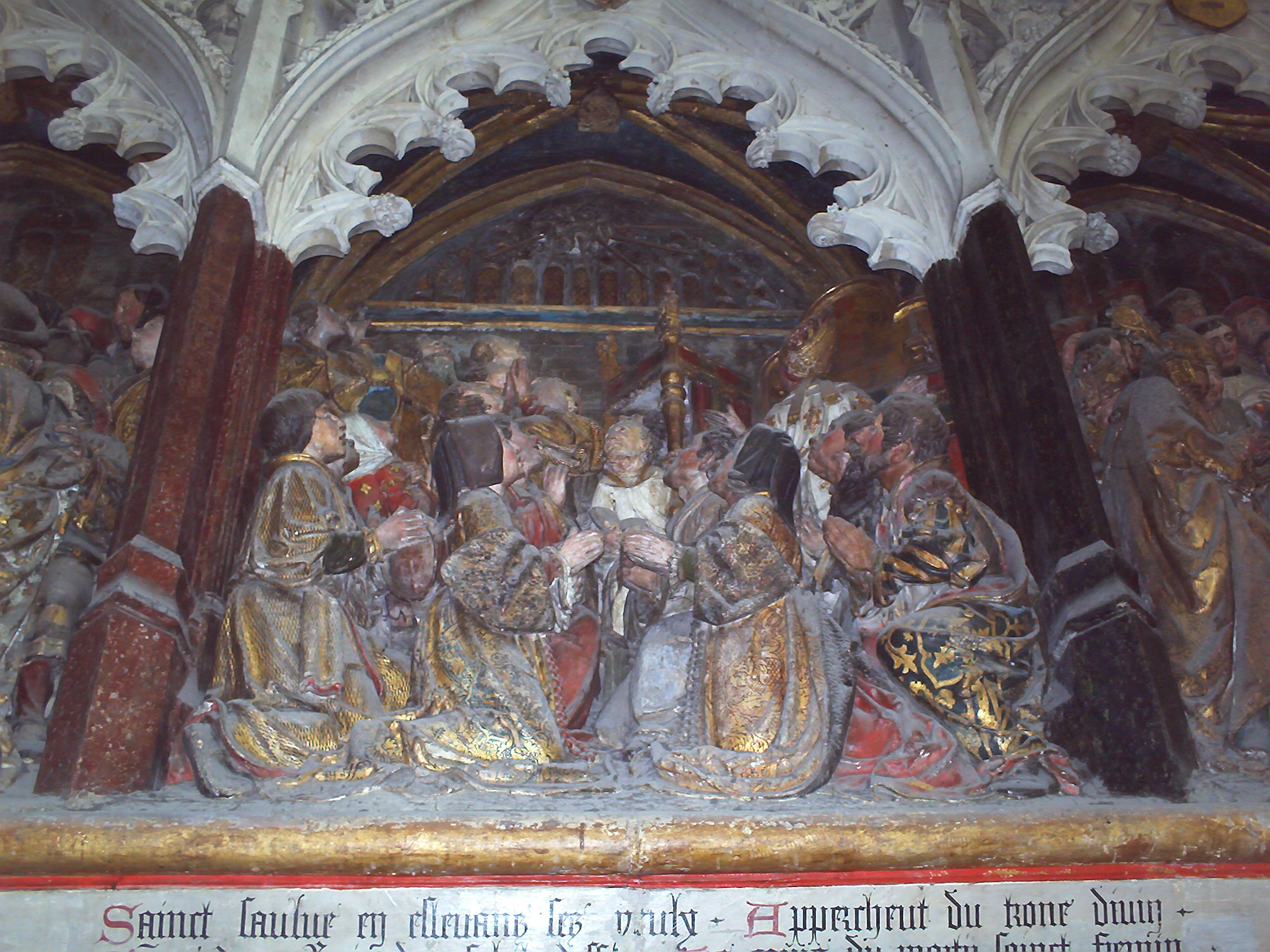
The grave of St Firmin is revealed.

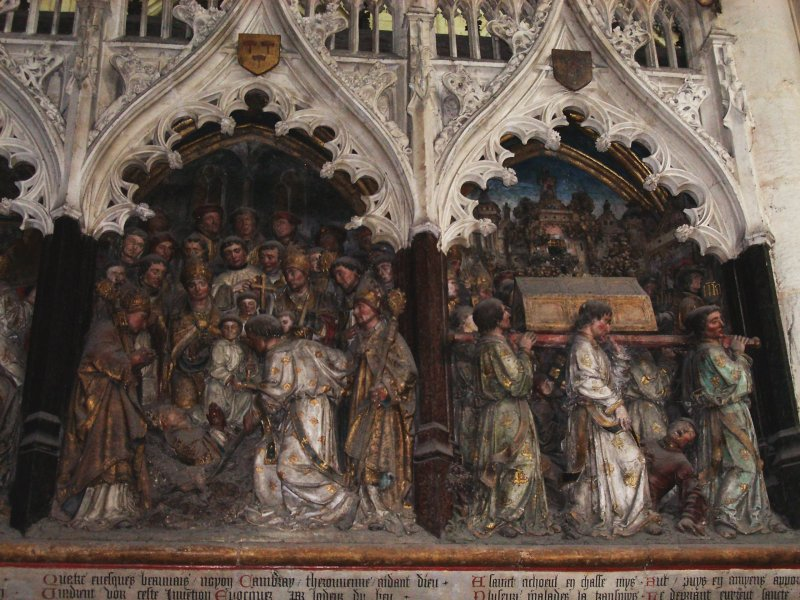
St Firmin's body is exhumed and translated to its final resting place.

== See also ==
- Saint Fermin, patron saint archive
- St. Firminus, Bishop of Uzès in 507 (ca 490 – 538, 551 or 11 October 553); Feast Day 11 October

== Bibliography ==
- Salmon, Charles (1861). Histoire de saint Firmin, martyr, premier évêque d'Amiens, patron de la Navarre et des diocèses d'Amiens et de Pampelune (in French). Arras: Rousseau-Leroy.
