= Salvius of Amiens =

7th-century Bishop of Amiens

Saint Salvius Bishop of Amiens
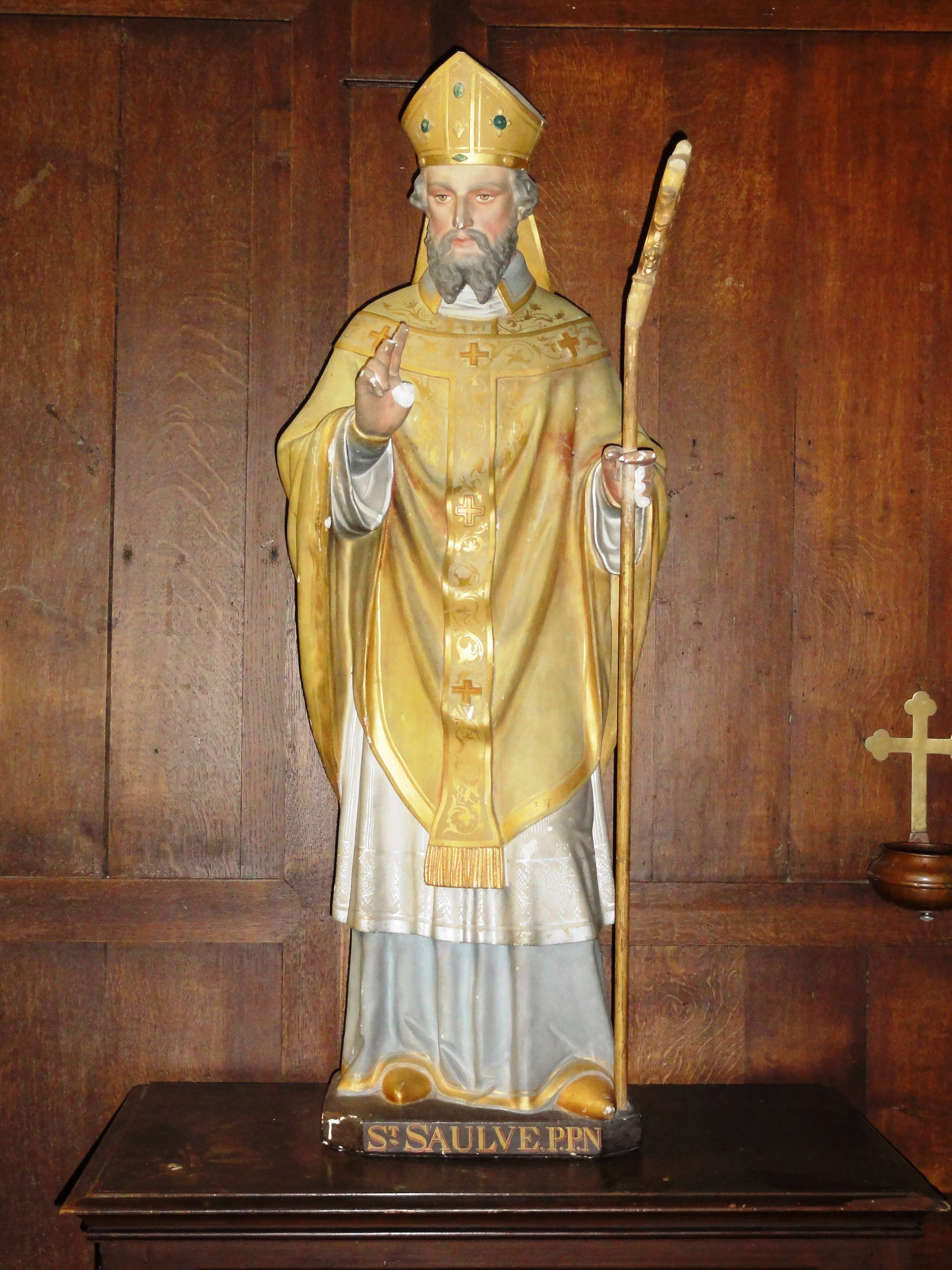
- Statue of saint Salvius in the Église Saint-Martin in Villers-Pol
- Residence: Amiens, France
- Died: c. 615
- Venerated in: Roman-Catholic Church
- Canonized: Pre-congregation
- Feast: 11 January (before 1970), 28 October (since 1970)
- Attributes: Bishop with a casket of relics of Saint Firminus of Amiens

Saint Salvius of Amiens (or Sauve, Salin, Salinius, Salve, Salvinus, Sauflieu, Saulve, Sauvre; died c. 615) was a 7th-century bishop of Amiens. His feast day according to the Roman Martyrology of 2004 is 28 October (before the liturgical calendar reform of 1969: 11 January).

== Life and legacy ==
Salvius was said to come from a wealthy family of Amiens. (Note: Jean-Baptiste de Sachy says that the Life of Salvius is full of anachronisms and contradictions and that there is reason to believe that they were falsified) He studied divinity from his youth, and led a very pure life. After his youth, he founded a monastery dedicated to the Virgin Mary in Montreuil, and became a monk and then abbot. Attracted by solitude, he wanted to retire to a cell, but instead was placed at the head of the diocese of Amiens. Salvius was Bishop of Amiens at the end of the 6th century. He assiduously traveled through his diocese, proclaiming to all the word of eternal life, and did much to uproot the last vestiges of paganism from the hearts of his flock. He built the first cathedral in the center of the city.

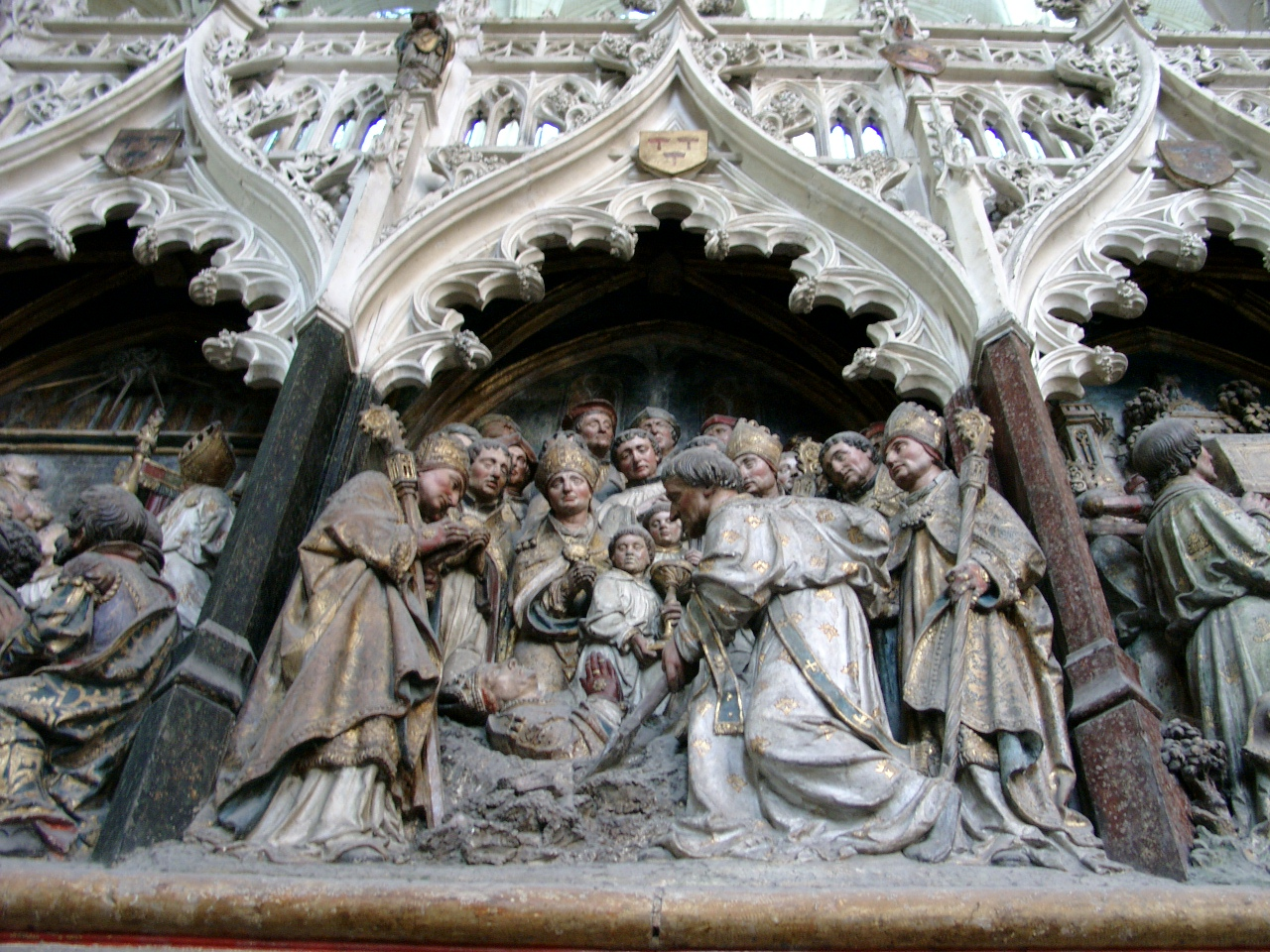
Discovery of St. Firmin's relics, sculpture in Notre-Dame d'Amiens

Salvius's body was transported to Montreuil, in the Diocese of Arras, where he is still venerated. The town of Saint-Saulve on the northern outskirts of Valenciennes is named after him. A triptych in the parish church is dedicated to St Saulve, protector of cattle and crops. According to Catholic tradition, Salvius discovered the remains of the martyr Fermin in Abladène, on the outskirts of Amiens, and had them transferred to the city's cathedral. Sculptures in the choir of the cathedral of Notre-Dame d'Amiens depict Salvius at the pulpit asking the faithful to find Firmin's body, the discovery of the relics at a place called Abladène on the road to Noyon, transport of the body. It heals cripples and restores leaves to trees as it passes.

== Baring-Gould's account ==
Sabine Baring-Gould (1834–1924) in his Lives Of The Saints wrote under January 11,

S. Salvius, of Amiens, B. C. (about 615.)
[Roman Martyrology. There are three bishops, Saints, of this name, one Bishop of Albi, one Bishop of Angouleme, and this one, Bishop of Amiens; they are often confounded by writers.]

S. SALVIUS lived as a monk for many years, in what monastery is not known. He was afterwards elected abbot. Being chosen Bishop of Amiens, he ruled the diocese with prudence, but little or nothing is known of his acts. As he died in an ecstasy, a brilliant light is said to have illuminated his cell, and praying with extended arms, he surrendered his soul.

== Monks of Ramsgate account ==
The monks of St Augustine's Abbey, Ramsgate wrote in their Book of Saints (1921),

Salvius (St.) Bp. (Jan 11)
(7th cent.) A Bishop of Amiens, in which See he succeeded St. Honoratus. He was famous for miracles and for his gift of supernatural prayer. He died A.D. 695. (Note: "He died A.D. 695": this must be a typo. His predecessor Honoratus of Amiens died c. 600. Baring-Gould's date of c. 615 is more plausible.) Some years later, his body was transferred to Montreuil.

== Butler's account ==
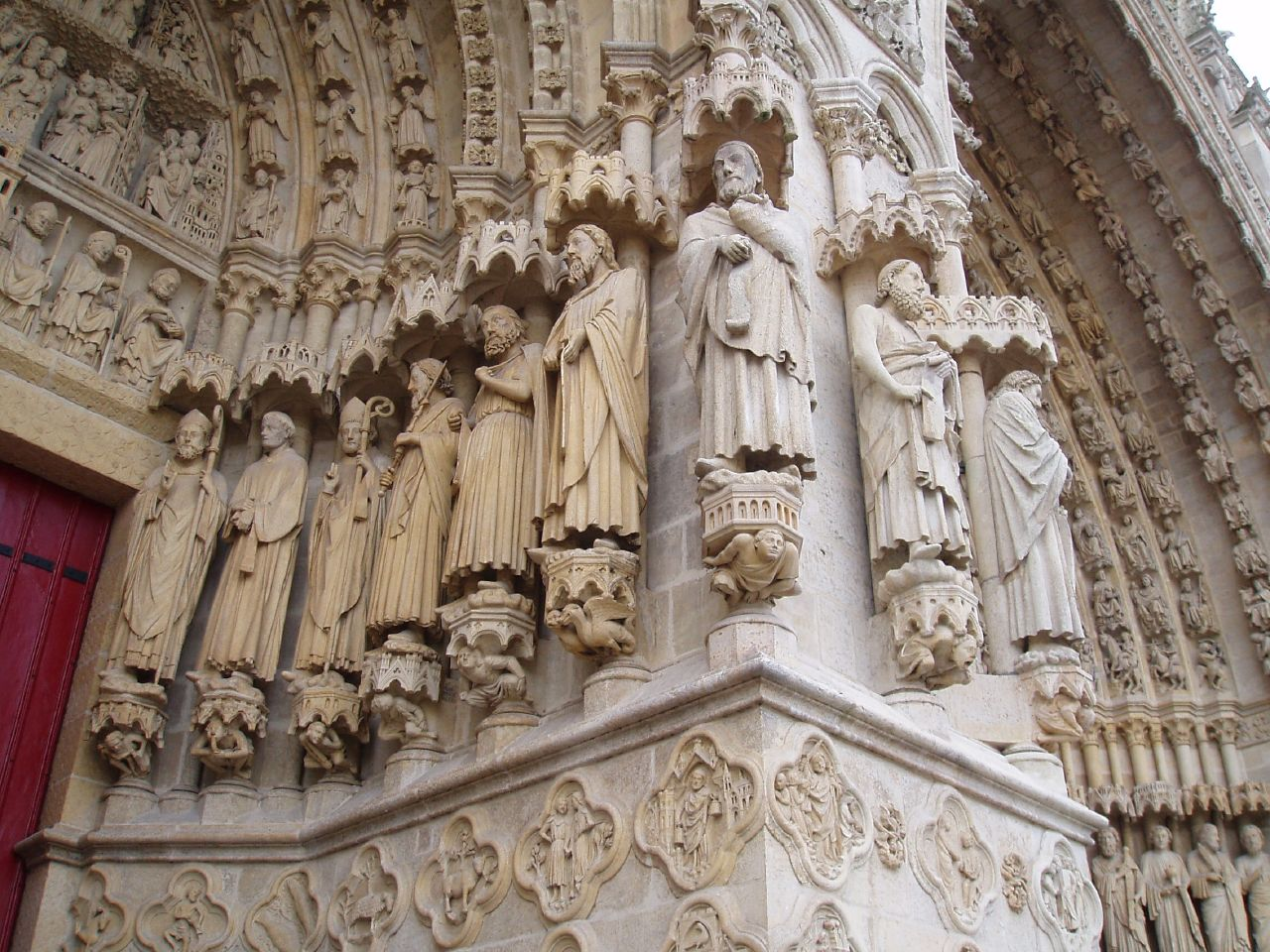
Saint Salvius, 3rd from the left, in St Firminius portal of Amiens Cathedral

The hagiographer Alban Butler (1710–1773) wrote in his Lives of the Fathers, Martyrs, and Other Principal Saints under January 11,

St. Salvius, or Sauve, Bishop of Amiens

Famous for miracles, succeeded Ado in 672, and flourished in the reign of Theodoric III. His relics rest at Montreuil, in Picardy, in the Benedictin Abbey which bears his name, whither they were translated from the cathedral of Amiens, several years after his death, as is related in his anonymous life, a piece of uncertain authority with regard to his actions. A relic of this saint was formerly kept with great veneration in the cathedral of Canterbury, mentioned in the history of that church, &c. This saint must not be confounded with St. Salvius of Albi, nor with the martyr of this name in Africa, on whose festival St. Austin made a sermon. See his anonymous life in Bollandus; also Baillet, Gall. Christ. Nova, t. 10. p. 1154. This seems the day of his translation, and the 28th of October that of his death.

== Sources ==
- Baring-Gould, S. (1897), The Lives Of The Saints: Volume 01, January, London: J. C. Nimmo This article incorporates text from this source, which is in the public domain.
- Butler, Alban (1812), The Lives of the Fathers, Martyrs, and Other Principal Saints: Compiled from Original Monuments and Other Authentic Records, Illustrated with the Remarks of Judicious Modern Critics and Historians, vol. 1, J. Murphy
- Cathédrale Notre-Dame d'Amiens, sculptures de la clôture du chœur
- Sachy, Jean-Baptiste Maurice de (1770), Histoire des évesques d'Amiens (in French), Abbeville: Veuve de Vérité Libraire
- "Saint Saulve", Nominis (in French), archived from the original on 2021-09-02
- St. Augustine's Abbey, Ramsgate (1921), The Book of saints : a dictionary of servants of God canonized by the Catholic Church, London: A. & C. Black, ltd. This article incorporates text from this source, which is in the public domain.
