= Saturnian =

Saturnian or Saturnial may refer to:

- Something of or relating to:

- Saturn, sixth planet from the Sun
- Saturn (mythology), a Roman agricultural deity

- Saturnian (poetry), the form of poetry which uses Saturnian Verse
- Saturnian (album), an album by saxophonist David S. Ware
