= Saint Honestus =

Spanish saint

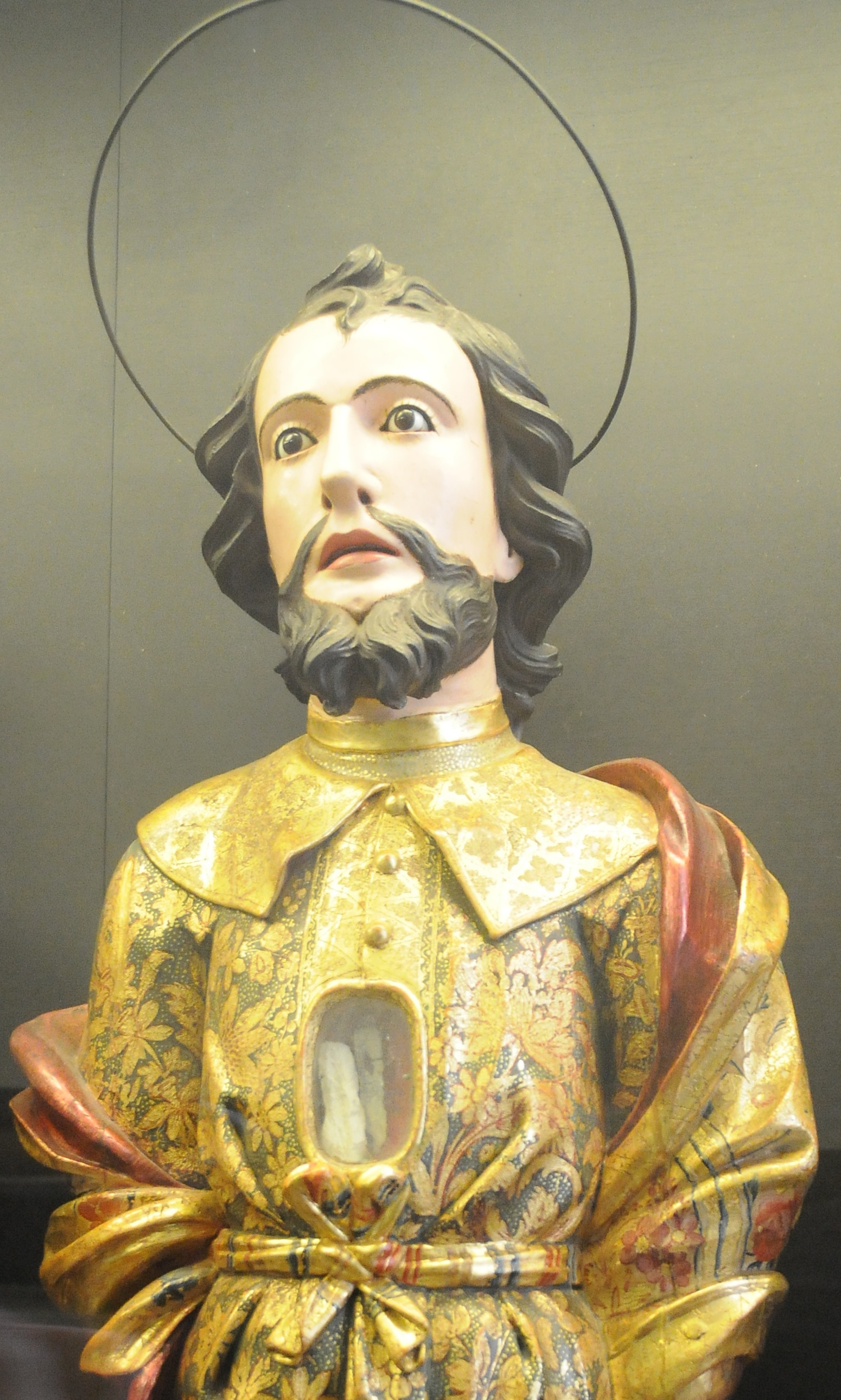

Apostle to Navarre and the Basque Country
- Born: Nîmes
- Died: c. 270 AD; Pamplona
- Venerated in: Catholic Church, Eastern Orthodox Church
- Feast: 16 February

Saint Honestus (Spanish: San Honesto, French: Saint Honest) was, according to Christian tradition, a disciple of Saturninus of Toulouse and a native of Nîmes.

Saturninus and Honestus evangelized in Spain, and Honestus was martyred at Pamplona during the persecutions of Aurelian. Elaboration of this legend states that Honestus was a nobleman of Nîmes who was appointed "apostle to Navarre and the Basque Country."

Further elaboration of his legend states that at Pamplona, he converted the senator Firmus and his family to Christianity, while Firmus's son, Saint Firminus, was christened by Saint Saturninus. Variants of this legend state that Honestus baptized Firminus himself.
