= Saturnino =

Saturnino is the Spanish, Portuguese, and Italian form of the name Saturninus. As a first name, it can refer to:

- Saturnino Arrúa, Paraguayan footballer
- Saturnino Herrán, Mexican painter
- Saturnino Rustrián, Guatemalan road bicycle racer
- Saturnino Perdriel, Argentine founder of Club de Gimnasia y Esgrima La Plata
- Saturnino and Mariano Lora, Cuban revolutionaries

== Other uses ==
- Manuel Saturnino da Costa
- Pernell Saturnino
- Fr. Saturnino Urios University
- Richard Saturnino Owens
