= Salvius of Albi =

Saint Salvius of Albi
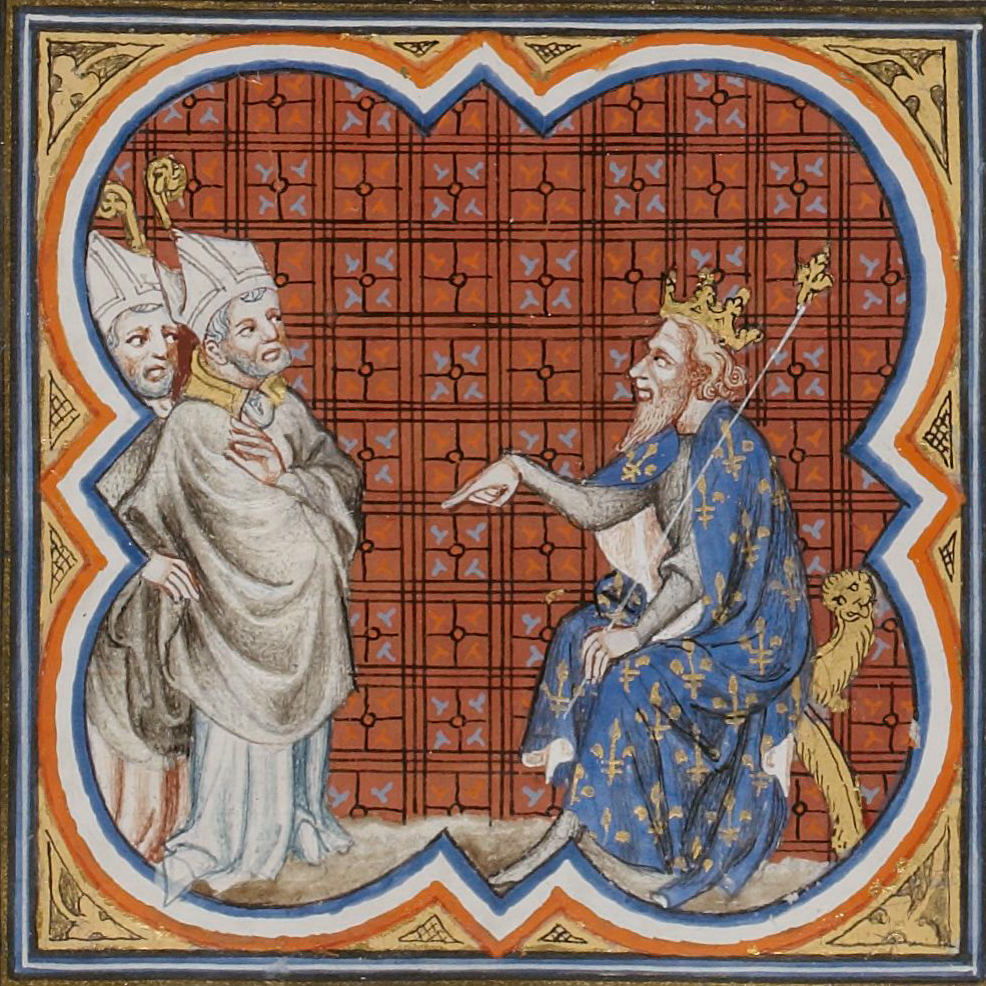
- St. Gregory and Salvius in front of King Chilperic I, from Grandes Chroniques de France de Charles V

Bishop of Albi; lawyer
- Born: Albi
- Died: 584
- Venerated in: Catholic Church; Eastern Orthodox Church
- Feast: 10 September

Salvius, Salvi or Sauve (died 584) was a bishop of Albi in Francia between 574 and 584, later venerated as a saint in the Catholic Church. His feast day is 10 September.

== Family ==
He came from a powerful family within the church, which contributed many bishops in the south of France through the end and fall of the Roman Empire. He was a distant relation of Gregory of Tours who wrote his life. He was also a relative of Saint Didier of Cahors.

== Life ==
Salvius was educated in law and humanities, before becoming a lawyer in Albi. Later he became a monk and a hermit and was made bishop in 574.

As bishop he intervened with the powerful Chilperic I and stayed in Albi to take care of his flock during a famine and a plague epidemic to which he succumbed in 584.

He was buried in his monastery but his remains were later moved to the church of Saint-Salvi in Albi. Their exact location is now lost because of renovation in the 18th century. After this he was venerated in the city and was later declared to be a saint.
