= Saint-Saturnin =

Saint-Saturnin (French for "Saint Saturninus") is the name or part of the name of several communes in France:

- Saint-Saturnin, Cantal, in the Cantal département
- Saint-Saturnin, Charente, in the Charente département
- Saint-Saturnin, Cher, in the Cher département
- Saint-Saturnin, Lozère, in the Lozère département
- Saint-Saturnin, Marne, in the Marne département
- Saint-Saturnin, Puy-de-Dôme, in the Puy-de-Dôme département
- Saint-Saturnin, Sarthe, in the Sarthe département
- Saint-Saturnin-de-Lenne, in the Aveyron département
- Saint-Saturnin-de-Lucian, in the Hérault département
- Saint-Saturnin-du-Bois, in the Charente-Maritime département
- Saint-Saturnin-du-Limet, in the Mayenne département
- Saint-Saturnin-lès-Apt, in the Vaucluse département
- Saint-Saturnin-lès-Avignon, in the Vaucluse département
- Saint-Saturnin-sur-Loire, in the Maine-et-Loire département

== See also ==
- Saint-Sernin (disambiguation)
