= Saturnina =

French Roman Catholic saint

Saint Saturnina
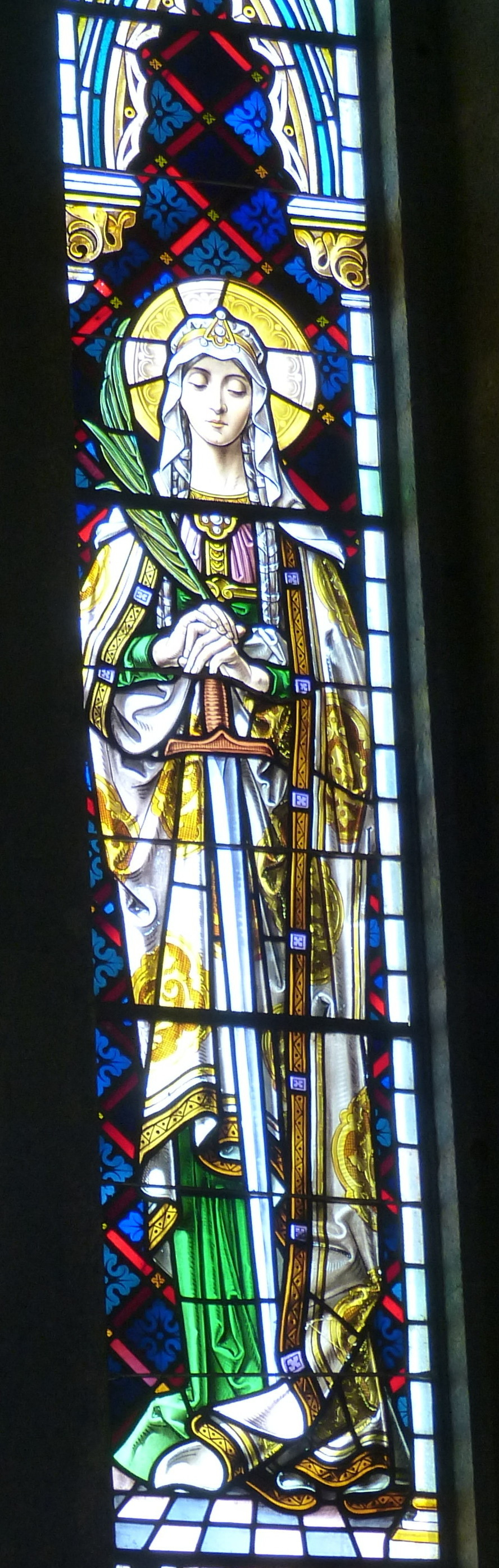

Martyr
- Born: Germany
- Died: ? Arras, France
- Venerated in: Roman Catholic Church, True Orthodox Church, Orthodox Church
- Feast: 4 June
- Patronage: farmers and wine merchants (Éleveurs)

Saint Saturnina (French: Sainte Saturnine) is a venerated Christian virgin martyr, whose legend states that she was killed in the year 907 because she wanted to remain faithful to her vow of virginity.

== Legend ==
Her legend states that she came from a noble German family (her father was a king), and that she took a vow of celibacy at the age of twelve. When her parents forced her into marriage when she turned twenty, she fled from Germany into France. The man to whom she had been promised, a Saxon lord, pursued her into France after receiving approval to do so from Saturnina's parents. He found her hiding with some shepherds at Arras; she had been working as a maidservant. He attempted to rape her, and when she resisted him, he decapitated her.

The lord miraculously drowned in a fountain, and Saturnina then carried her own head in her hands, and as witnessed by the townspeople, carried her head to the church of St. Remi, which was in the next village: Sains-Les-Marquion. She was then buried there. Another tradition states that Saturnina placed her head on a stone at Sains-lès-Marquion, proclaiming herself to be the last human sacrifice the town would ever suffer.

== Veneration ==
At Sains-lès-Marquion, the local townspeople planted a tree next to the stone that represented the shepherd's crook that she had carried, and a local tradition concerning Saturnina and her tree still exists.

Some of her relics were transferred to Saxony from Sains-lès-Marquion. They were transferred to Neuenheerse in Bad Driburg, Saxony. The nuns there gathered many relics, including those of Saint Saturnina.

The Stiftskirche St. Saturnina ("Convent church of St. Saturnina") in Neuenheerse (Eggedom), Bad Driburg, was built from 1100 to 1130, but was heavily damaged in a fire due to lightning in 1965.

Writers compiling the lives of Saints Romana and Benedicta copied Saturnina's legend, according to Adrien Baillet.
