= Saturnin =

3rd-century founding bishop of Toulouse

Saint Saturnin
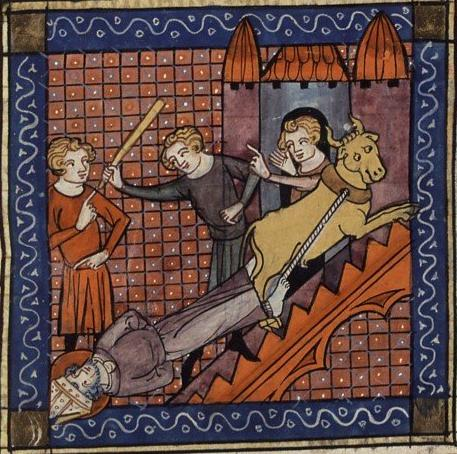
- The Martyrdom of Saint Saturnin, from a 14th-century manuscript

Apostle to the Gauls Bishop and Martyr
- Born: third century Patras, Greece
- Died: c. AD 257; Toulouse, Gaul (modern-day France)
- Venerated in: Roman Catholic Church; Eastern Orthodox Church
- Canonized: Pre-Congregation
- Major shrine: Basilique St-Sernin, Toulouse
- Feast: 29 November
- Attributes: A bishop's mitre, a bishop being dragged by a bull, a bull
- Patronage: Toulouse, France

Saturnin of Toulouse (Latin: Saturninus, Occitan: Sarnin, French: Saturnin, Sernin, Catalan: Serni, Sadurní, Galician: Sadurninho and Portuguese: Saturnino, Sadurninho, Basque: Satordi, Saturdi, Zernin, and Spanish: Saturnino, Serenín, Cernín) was one of the "Apostles to the Gauls" sent out (probably under the direction of Pope Fabian, 236–250) during the consulate of Decius and Gratus (250–251) to Christianise Gaul after the persecutions under Emperor Decius had all but dissolved the small Christian communities. Fabian sent out seven bishops from Rome to Gaul to preach the Gospel: Gatien to Tours, Trophimus to Arles, Paul to Narbonne, Saturnin to Toulouse, Denis to Paris, Austromoine to Clermont, and Martial to Limoges. His feast day is 29 November.

== Background ==
Saturnin is styled the first Bishop of Tolosa (Toulouse). The lost Acts of Saturninus were employed as historical sources by the chronicler Gregory of Tours. The martyrology gave a genealogy for Saturnin: the son of Aegeus, King of Achaea, by his wife Cassandra, who, herself, was the daughter of Ptolemy, King of the Ninevites. The Acts placed Saturninus in the 1st century, made him one of the 72 disciples of Christ, placed him at the Last Supper. Legends associated with Saturninus state that after Peter consecrated him a bishop, "he was given for his companion Papulus, later to become Saint Papulus the Martyr." Legend states that besides Papulus, Saturninus also had Honestus as a disciple.

The detail from the Acts that is selected for remembering today describes his martyrdom: to reach the Christian church Saturninus had to pass before the capitol (not to be confused with the present Capitole de Toulouse whose site was founded in the 12th century, the Roman Capitol of the city was towards the present Place Esquirol), where there was an altar, and according to the Acts, the pagan priests ascribed the silence of their oracles to the frequent presence of Saturninus. One day they seized him and on his unshakeable refusal to sacrifice to the images they condemned him to be tied by the feet to a bull which dragged him about the town until the rope broke. (Tellingly, the identical fate was ascribed to his pupil Fermin whose site of martyrdom is at Pamplona.)

The bull, it is said, finished at the place since named Matabiau, that is, matar ("the killing") and biau or bœuf ("bull"). An inversion of this martyrdom, the tauroctony, the "killing of the bull," is precisely the central rite of Mithraism, the most important icon in the mithraeum, a depiction of Mithras in the act of killing a bull. The tauroctony was either painted or depicted in a sculptural relief, sometimes on the altar. Two Christian women (puellae remembered as "les Puelles") piously gathered up the remains and buried them in a "deep ditch", that they might not be profaned by the pagans. It is not beyond possibility, in this part of Gaul, where even today the greatest bull among many in Toulouse is honored with the name "Le Grand Taur", that the deep ditch was in fact a mithraeum.

The site, said to be "where the bull stopped", is on the rue du Taur ("Street of the Bull"). The street with the Mithraic name is one of the original Roman cross streets running straight from the Capitole now to the Romanesque basilica honoring Saint Saturnin ("St Sernin").

== "Notre-Dame du Taur" ==
Saturnin's successors at Toulouse, Hilary (bishop 358 – 360) and Exuperius (Exupère) (died ca. 410), gave him more honorable burial, once Christian rites were no longer illicit, by erecting a simple wooden oratory over the "Roman crypt" (as modern guides describe it) where he had been interred. The noteworthy 14th-century Gothic church that eventually replaced earlier buildings is Notre-Dame du Taur ("Our Lady of the Bull").

At the end of the century, the press of pilgrims to the cramped site encouraged Bishop Silvius (360–400) to build a larger church, finished by his successor Exuperius (Exupère) (400 – ?) in 402. The body of Saturnin was translated to the new church, which now forms the crypt of the present Romanesque basilica, one of the buildings that defines the Romanesque style in southern France. The basilica is not the cathedral, which is dedicated to Saint Stephen. The reburial place was at the crossing, before the altar, where the Saturnin's relics remained until 1284.

At the same time the bishop took the official Acts of Saturnin, the Passio antiqua, and rewrote them as a panegyric that took the place of the originals embellishing them with colorful details, and with pious legends linking Saturnin to the founding of the churches of Eauze, Auch, Pamplona, and Amiens. Even so, they are among the oldest documents of the Gallican Church.

== Places named after him ==
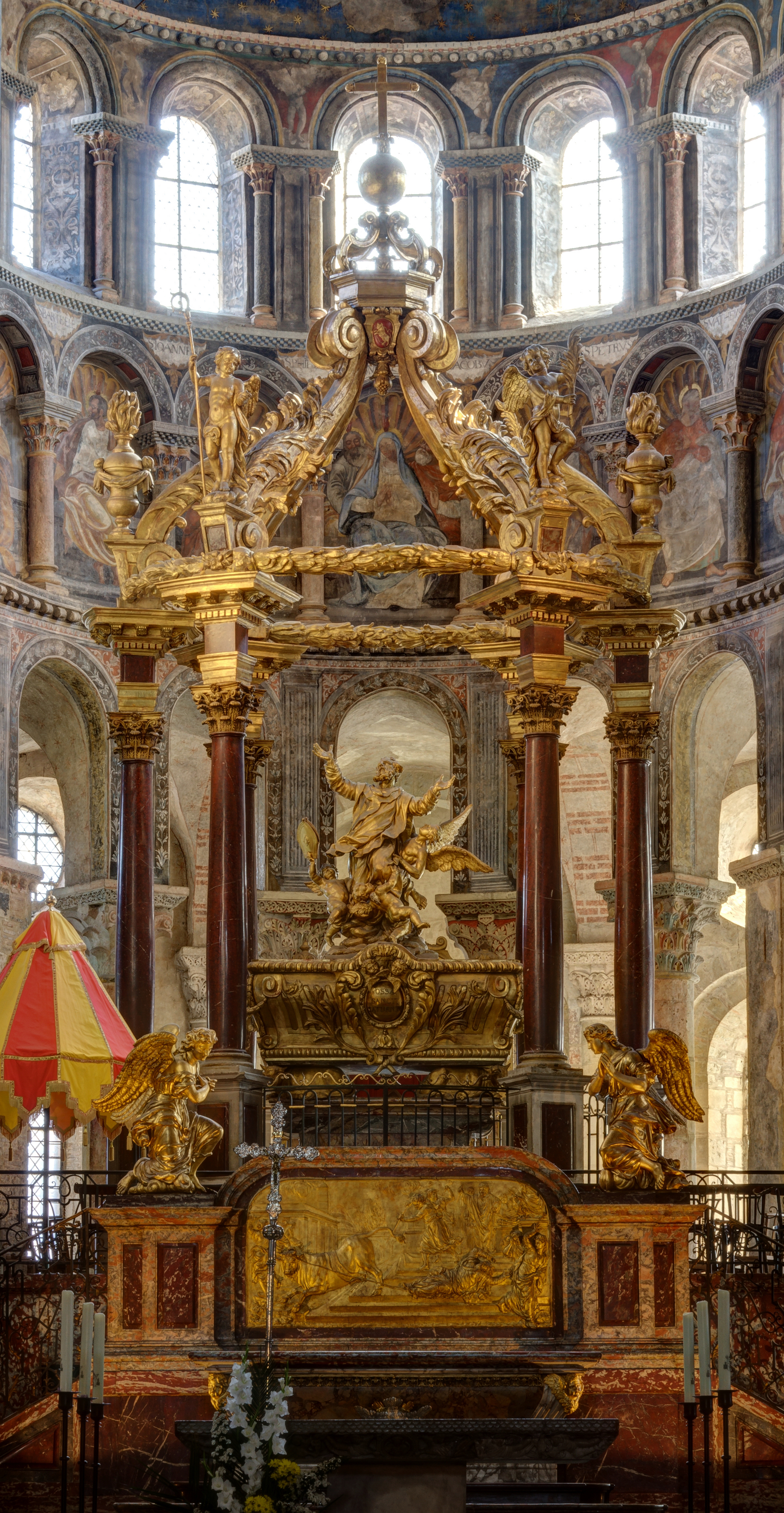
Tomb of St. Saturnin in the Basilica of St. Sernin, Toulouse, France

- numerous places in France named Saint-Saturnin
- numerous places in France named Saint-Sernin
- Burgo de San Cernín, Navarre, Spain. It was the Languedocian borough of Pamplona.
- In Catalonia, Spain.
  - Sant Sadurní d'Anoia
  - Sant Sadurní d'Osormort
  - Sant Sadurní de l'Heura
- In Asturias, Spain.
  - San Saturnino
- In Portugal
  - São Saturnino, Fronteira
- In Wales
  - Llansadwrn, Anglesey

== See also ==
- Saint Saturnin, patron saint archive

== Relevant literature ==
- Oškerová, Martina. 2014. "Zdeněk Jirotka: Saturnin Analysis of English translation by Mark Corner." Thesis, Masaryk University.
- Sehnalová, Kamila. 2013. "Comparative Analysis of Czech, English and German Proverbs in Jirotka's Saturnin." Thesis, Charles University.
