= Clémence Isaure fountain =

Fountain in Toulouse, France

Coordinates: 43°36′44″N 1°26′44″E

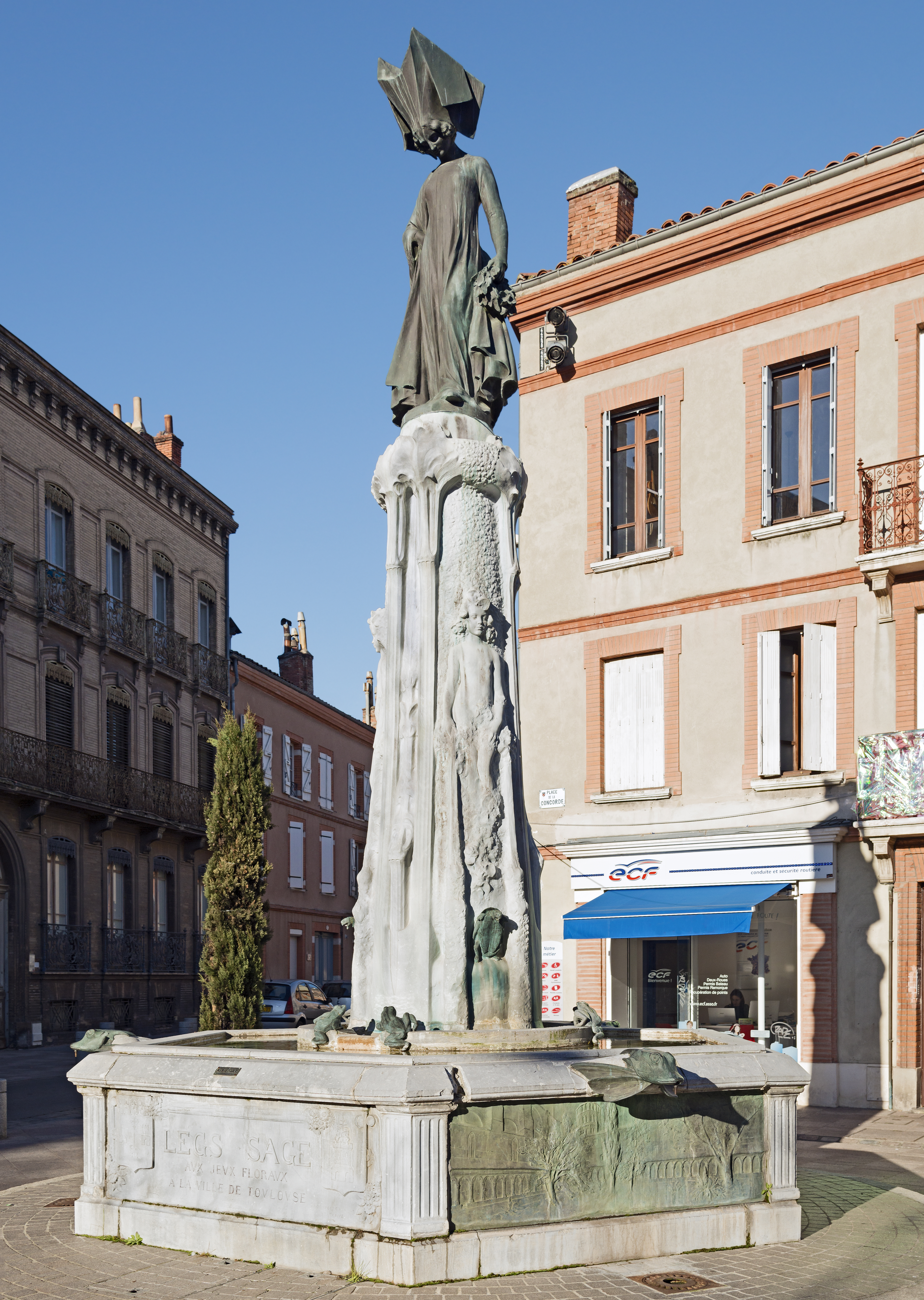
Clémence Isaure fountain.

The Clémence Isaure fountain (fr: Fontaine Clémence Isaure) is a fountain with a bronze sculpture in Toulouse, France. It represents Clémence Isaure.

== History ==
Its construction was patronized by Octave Sage, a pharmacist, in 1905. It was designed by sculptor Léo Laporte-Blairsy. It was dedicated in 1913.

In 1942, during World War II, the bronze sculpture was removed and hidden to avoid being melted down and turned into weaponry. It was restored after the war.
