= Julie Charpentier =

French sculptor (1770–1843)

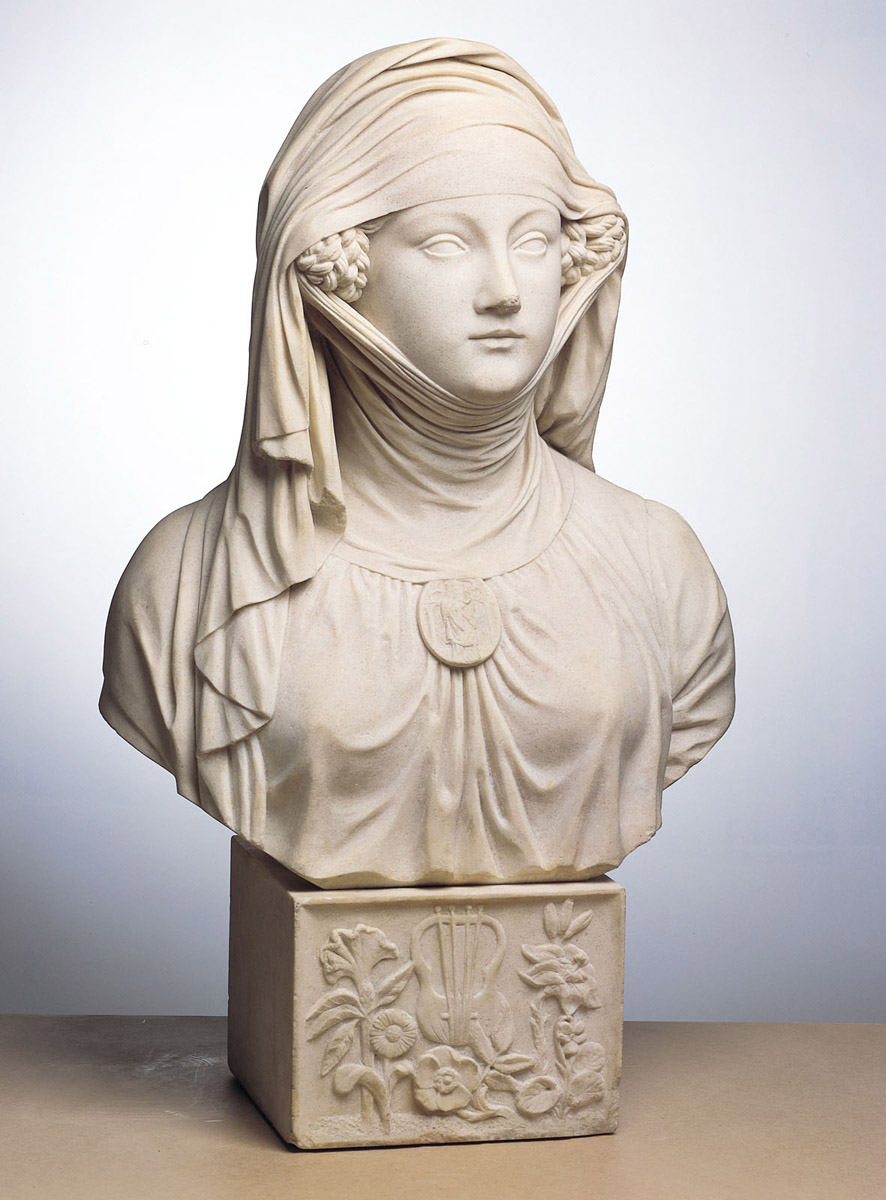
Clémence Isaure, Musée des Augustins

Julie Charpentier (French pronunciation: [ʒyli ʃaʁpɑ̃tje]; 1770–1843) was a French sculptor.

Charpentier was born in Paris, the daughter of François-Philippe Charpentier, mécanicien du roi, and grew up in the Louvre in government-owned lodgings. From her father she learned drawing, also taking lessons from Augustin Pajou.

She began exhibiting her work in 1787 and first showed at the Louvre Salon in 1793; she continued to send works to the Salon every year from 1798 until 1824, working in terra cotta, stone, and plaster. Many of her sculptures were produced to government commissions, including four of the 425 bas-reliefs on the column of the place Vendôme.

In 1801 Charpentier offered her services as a taxidermist to the National Museum of Natural History, and for twenty-five years thereafter mounted a range of animals for the institution. In 1826 she was granted a salaried post, but this was not enough to keep her from penury, and she died in poverty in the Salpêtrière.

Several sculptures by Charpentier are in the collection of the Château de Blois, including a possible self-portrait. A bust of a man is in the Musée Antoine Lécuyer in Saint-Quentin, while a bust of Clémence Isaure is in the musée des Augustins in Toulouse.
