= François-Philippe Charpentier =

François-Philippe Charpentier (b. Blois, 1734; d. there 22 July 1817) was a French engraver and inventor.

His father was a bookbinder, a poor man who reportedly made many sacrifices so that his son might attend the Jesuit college at Blois; but after young Charpa few years he was compelled to leave and work to support himself. He chose to pursue the art of engraving, and entered the atelier of a copperplate engraver in Paris. He made a number of inventions related to this field, the first being a purely mechanical process for engraving in aquatint (gravure au lavis) and in colour. After making many prints using the technique, he sold the secret. An engraver and patron of art, the Comte de Caylus, was one of the first to use the new machine.

Louis XVI gave him the appointment of "Royal Mechanician" (Mécanicien du Roi), and provided a studio for him in the gardens of the Louvre, where he used a burning-mirror for melting metals without fire. He invented a fire-engine which was very widely adopted and, in 1771, a machine for drilling metals. Another invention for mechanical engraving was one which enabled lace-manufacturers to engrave in a few hours elaborate patterns and designs which formerly had required at least six months work of the burin. Charpentier's device for lighthouse-illumination so pleased Louis XVI that he offered the inventor a pension and a place as the head of the Department of Beacons, asking him to fix the price for his discovery. Charpentier reportedly refused the pension and suggested that the office be given to a younger man, saying that he would "prefer freedom in order to devote himself to the development of his ideas". He received a thousand crowns for his discovery.

During the period of the French Directory he made an instrument for boring six gun-barrels at once, and a machine to saw six boards simultaneously. For these the government paid him 24,000 francs and named him director of the Atelier de prefectionnement, established at the Hôtel Montmorency. Charpentier received many offers from Russia and England for his labour-saving devices, but refused them all. He died as he had lived, in poverty. His chief extant works of his, all prints, are: Education of the Virgin, after François Boucher; Death of Archimedes, after Ciro Ferri; Shepherdess, after Nicolaes Berchem; Descent from the Cross, in colour, after Vanloo.

Charpentier was the father of the sculptor Julie Charpentier.
