= Clémence Isaure =

French composer, poet (b. 1450)

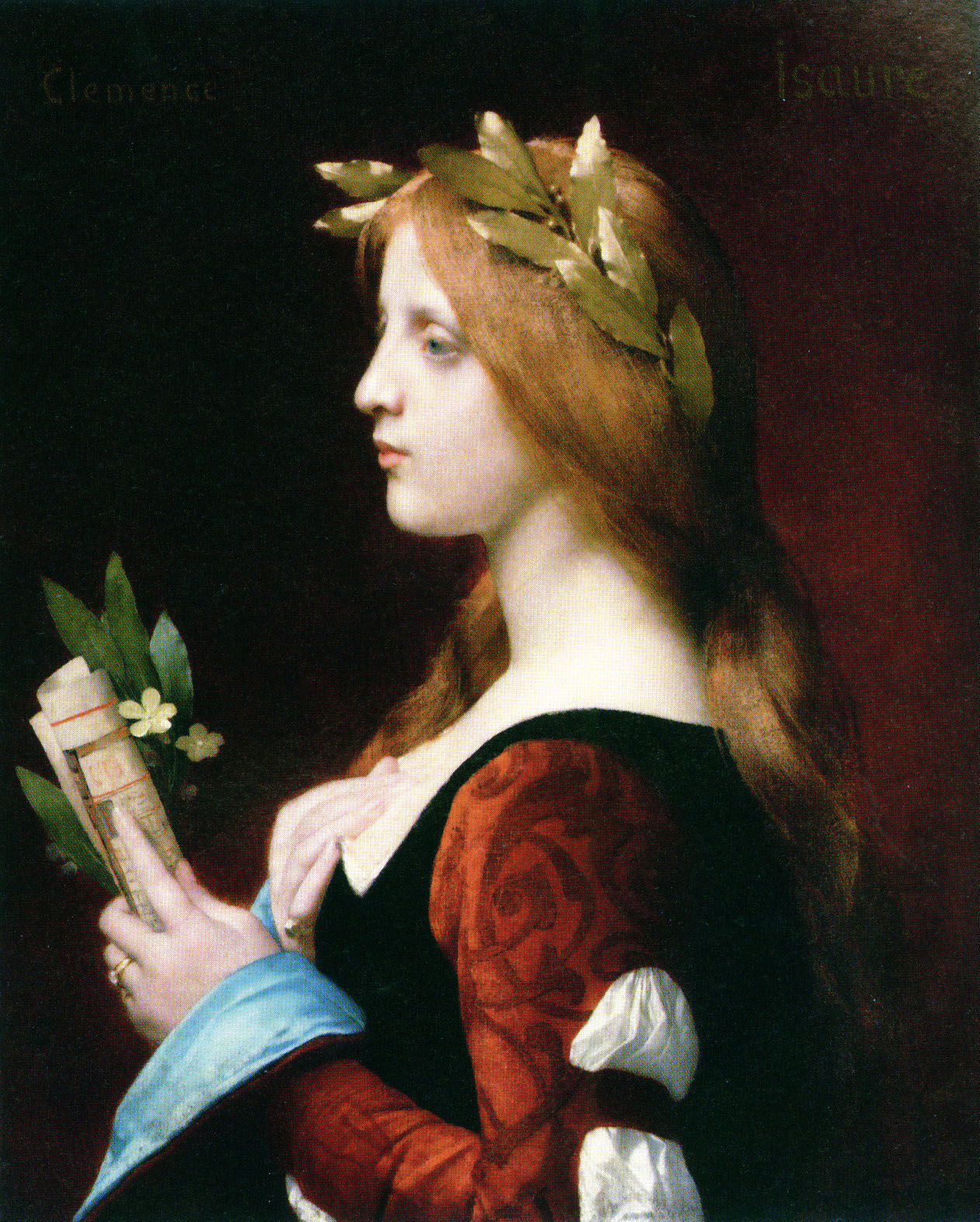
Dame Clémence Isaure by Jules Joseph Lefebvre

Clémence Isaure [kle.mɑ̃s i.zɔʁ] is a legendary Occitan medieval figure credited with founding or restoring the Acadèmia dels Jòcs Florals or Academy of the Floral Games. She is supposed to have left a legacy to fund awards in the form of gold and silver flowers that the city of Toulouse would award annually to the best poets.

As the mythic founder of the games she is celebrated principally in Toulouse, where poems, sculptures, and paintings have been dedicated to her and a variety of places and institutions bear her name. In order to provide her with a realistic outline, she has been identified as a member of the Yzalguier family of Toulouse. In 1806 the rue des Yzalguier there was renamed the rue Clémence-Isaure. A tower at 7 de la rue Cujas was named the Tour Clémence Isaure. (It was demolished in 1817.)

For example, Charles Cros wrote in 1888:

Toulouse! ville antique où fleurissent encore
Pour les poètes, vos fleurs d’or, Clémence Isaure

Toulouse! ancient city where flourish still
For poets your golden flowers, Clémence Isaure

== Iconography ==
- Clémence Isaure fountain
- Clémence Isaure appearing to the troubadors, hall of the notables, Capitole de Toulouse
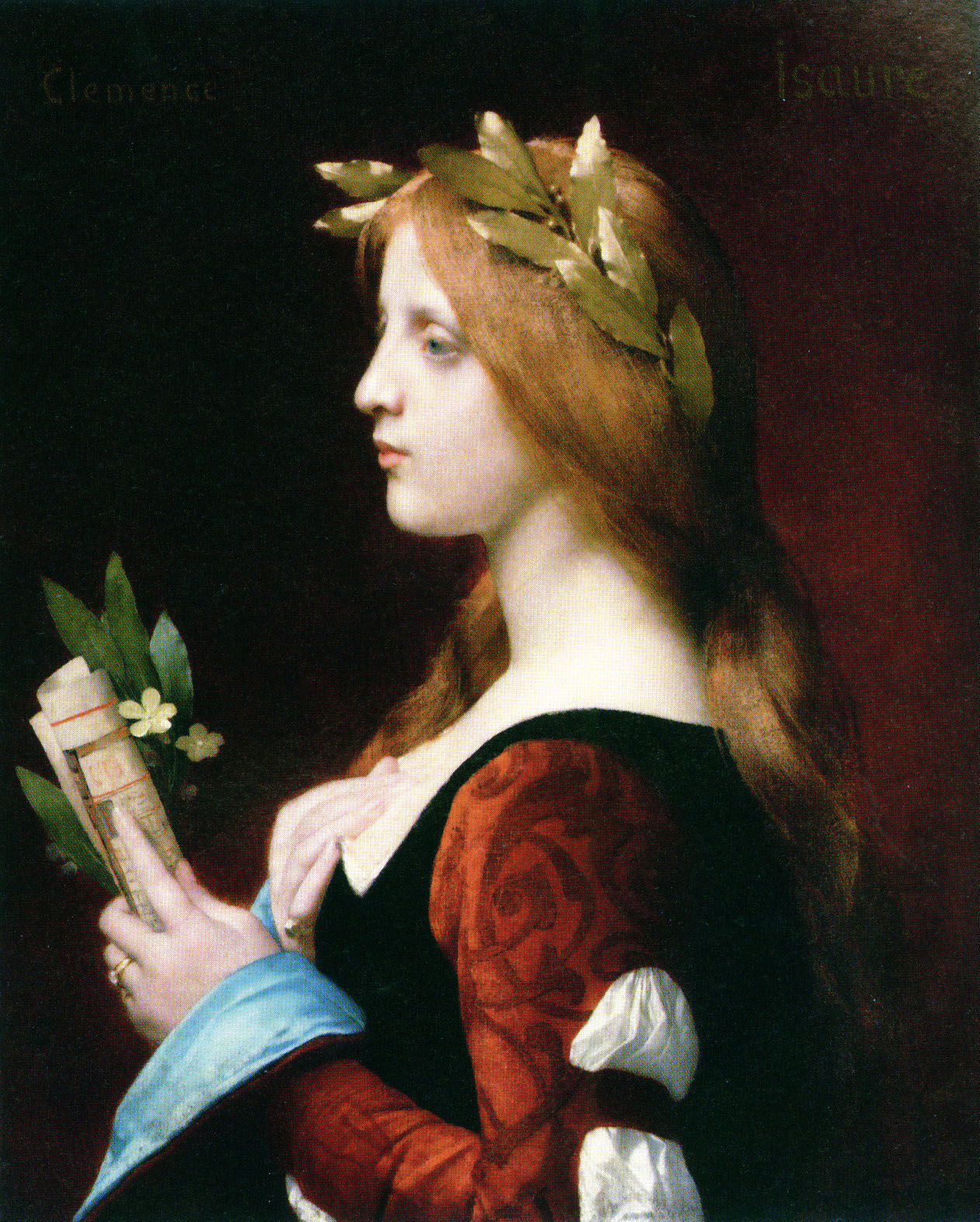
Jules Joseph Lefebvre (1836-1911), Clémence Isaure, oil on canvas, private collection Fred and Sherry Ross

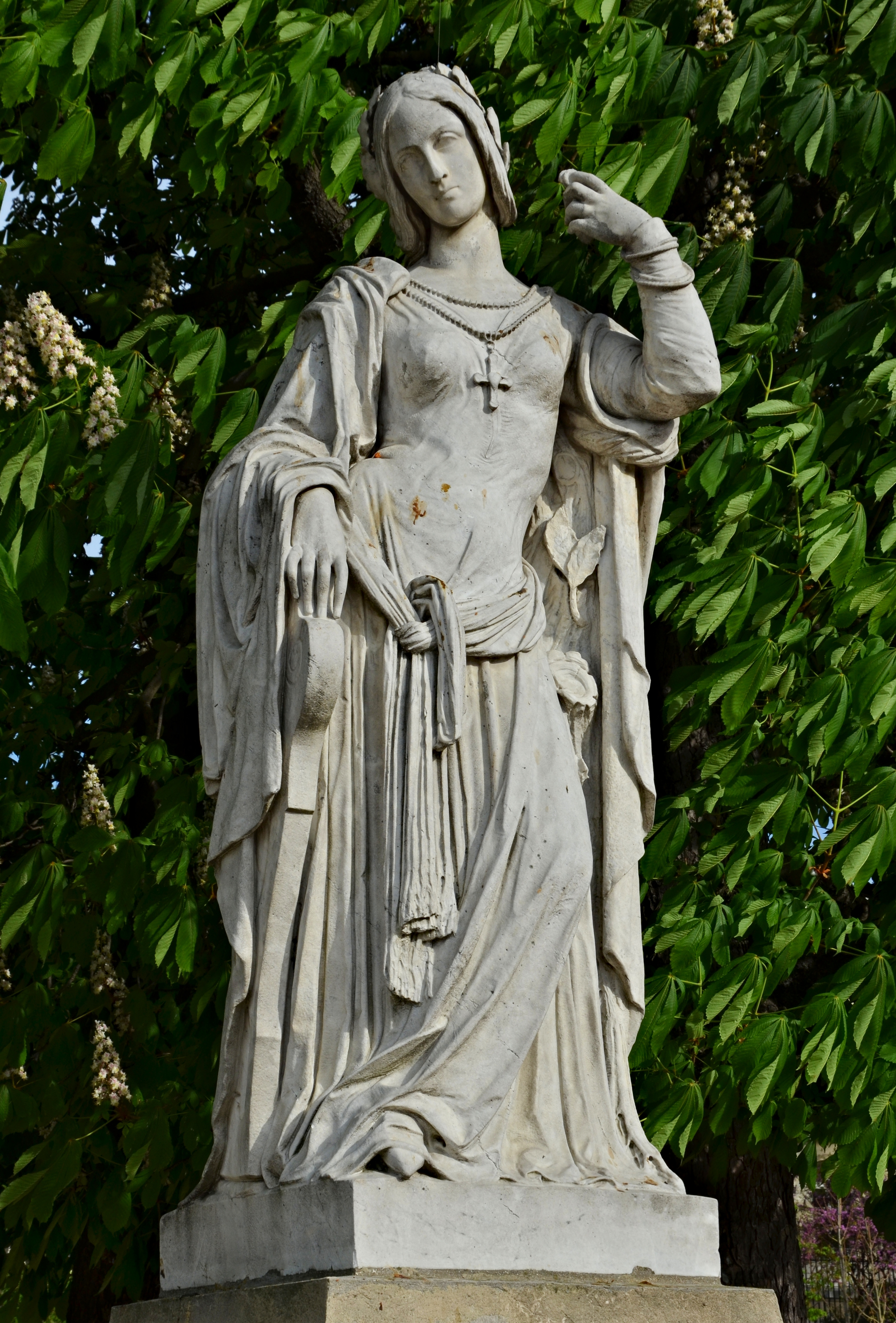
Auguste Préault, Clémence Isaure. One of the Queens of France and Illustrious Women that stand in the Jardin du Luxembourg in Paris

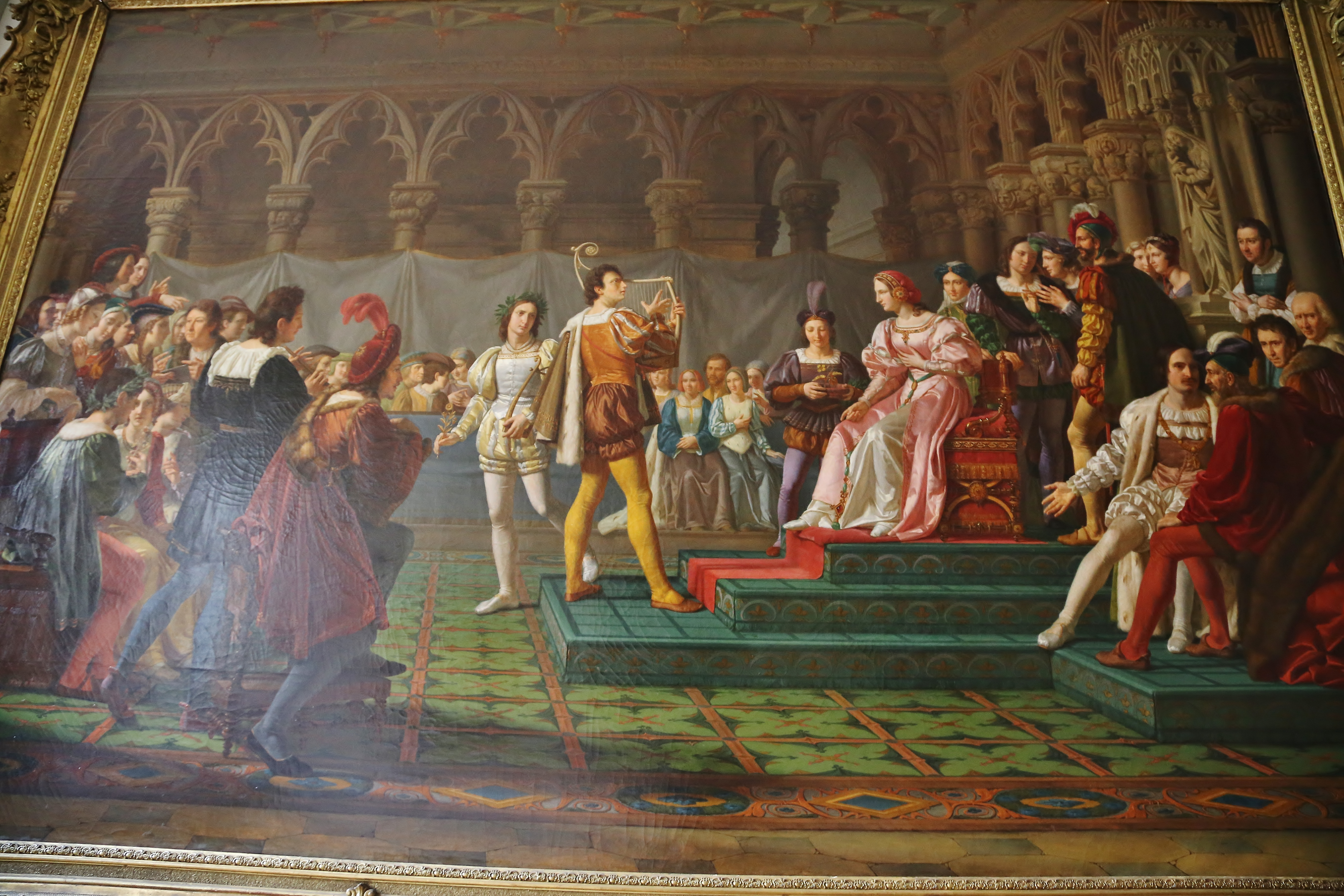
Félix Saurines, Clémence Isaure distributing flowers to the troubadors.

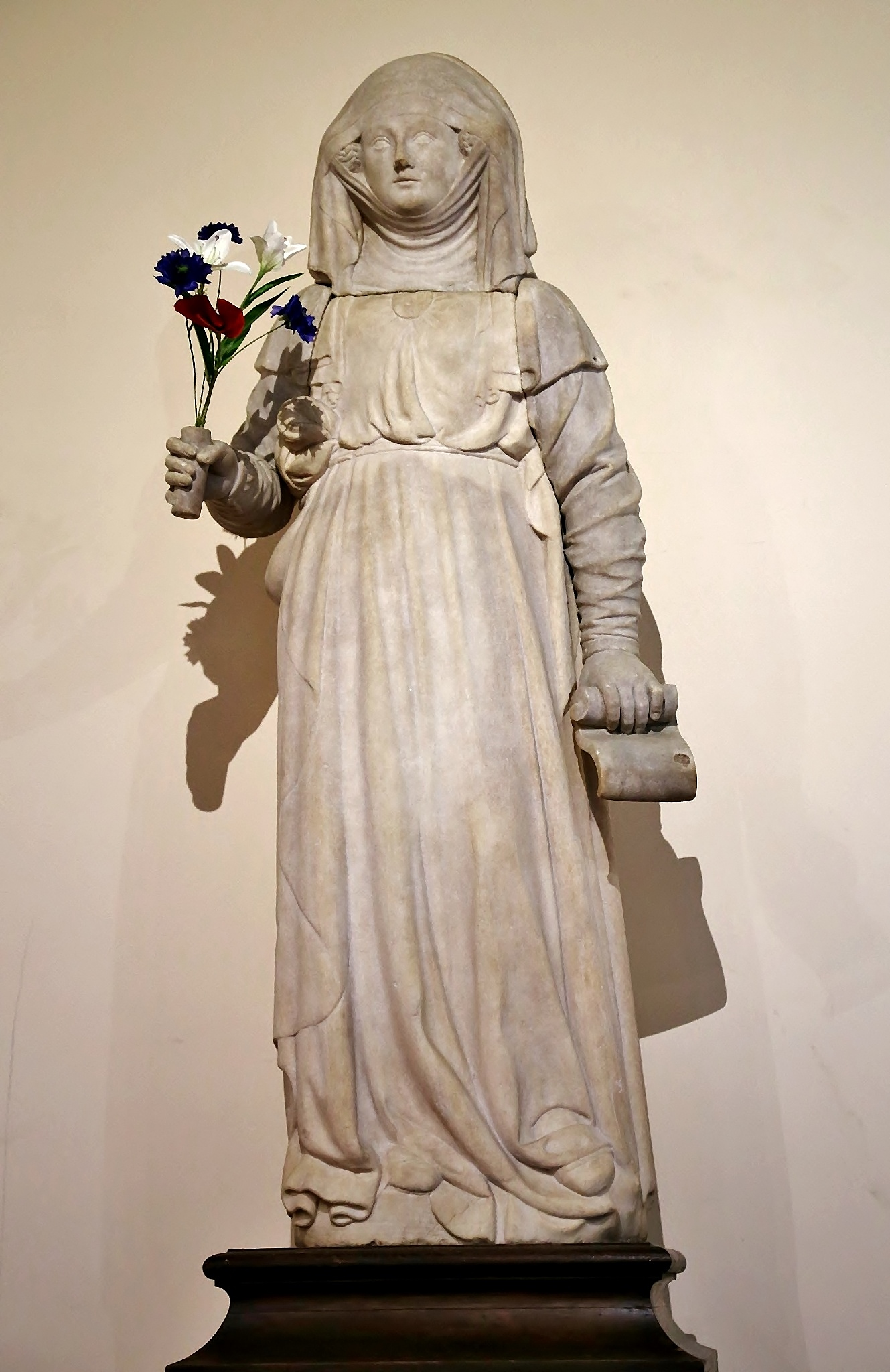
The first statue of Clémence Isaure, 16th century (Toulouse).

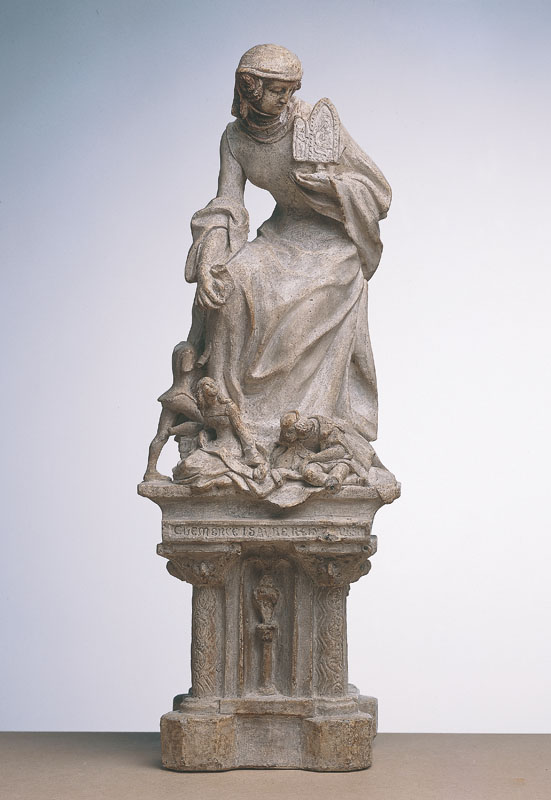
Félicie de Fauveau, Clémence Isaure, Musée des Augustins.

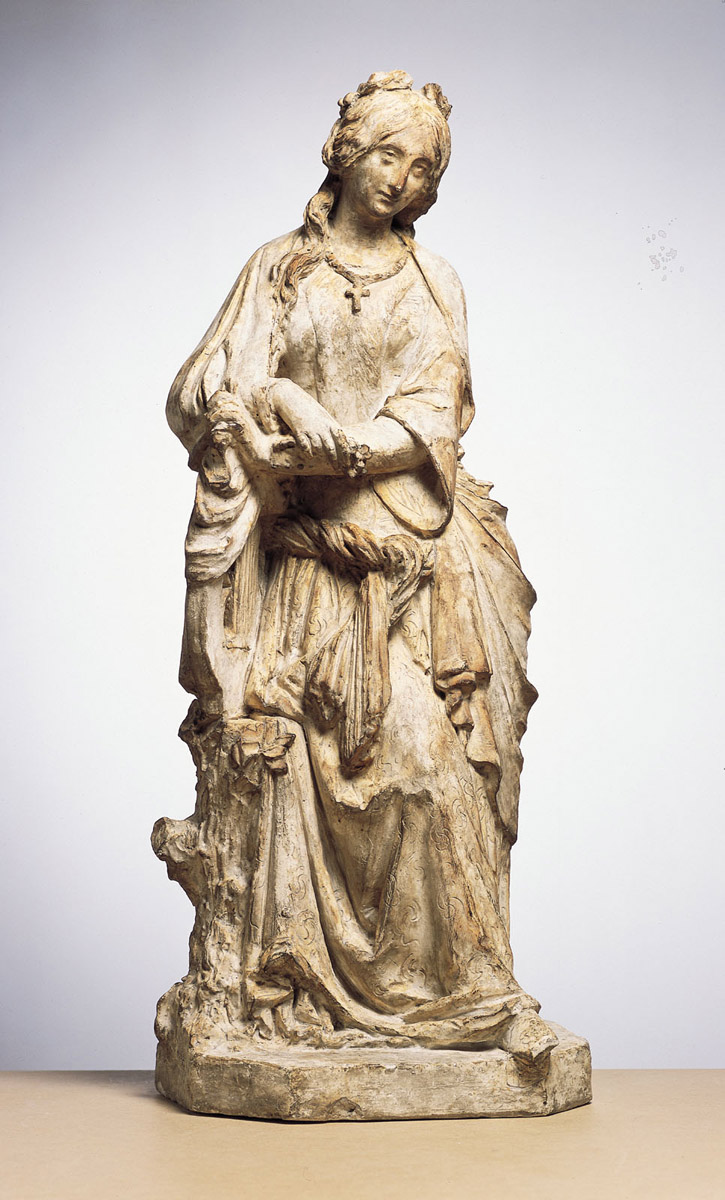
Bernard Griffoul-Dorval, Clémence Isaure, Musée des Augustins

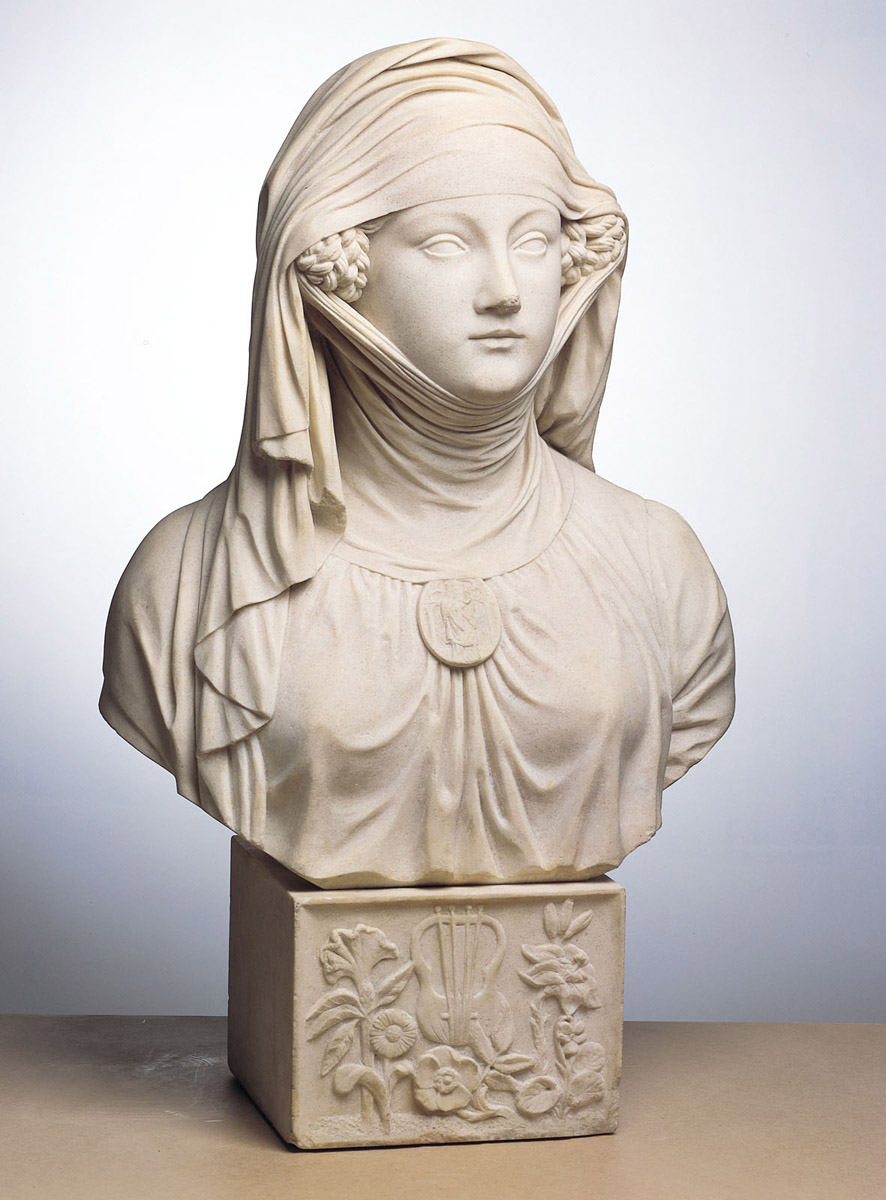
Julie Charpentier, Clémence Isaure, Musée des Augustins

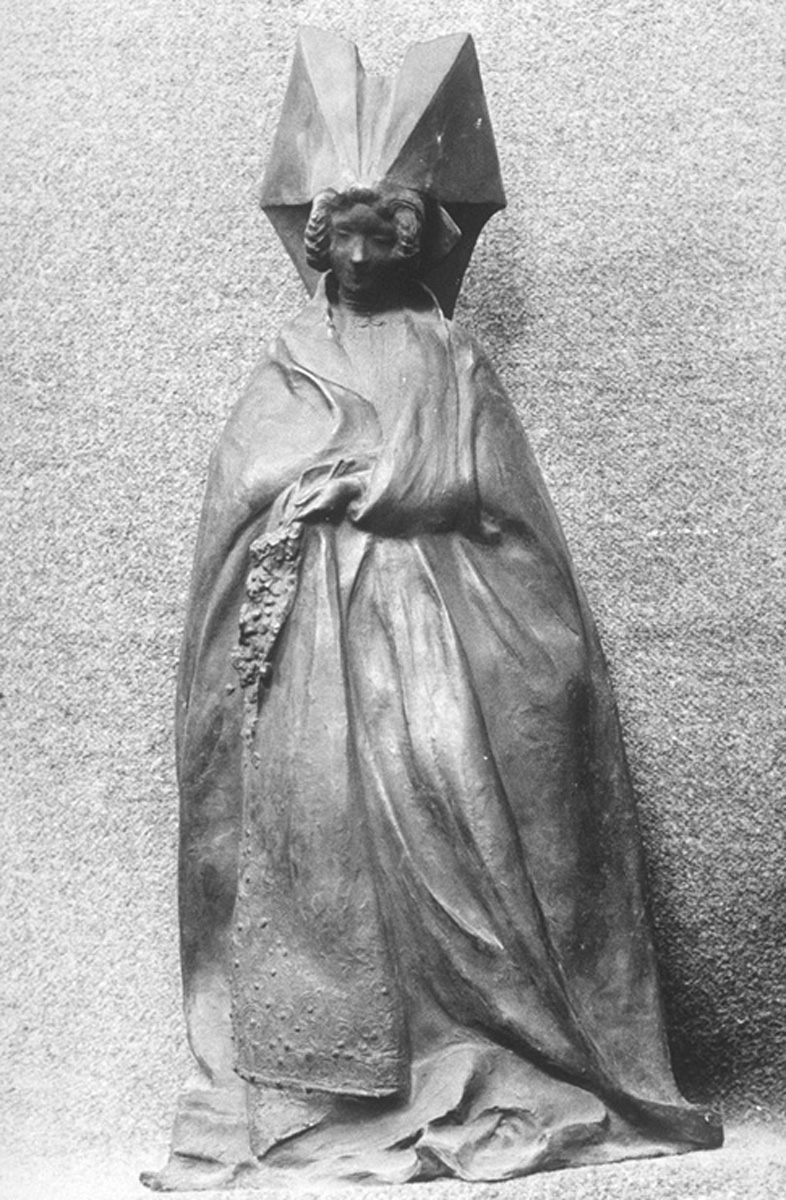
Léo Laporte-Blairsy, Clémence Isaure, Musée des Augustins

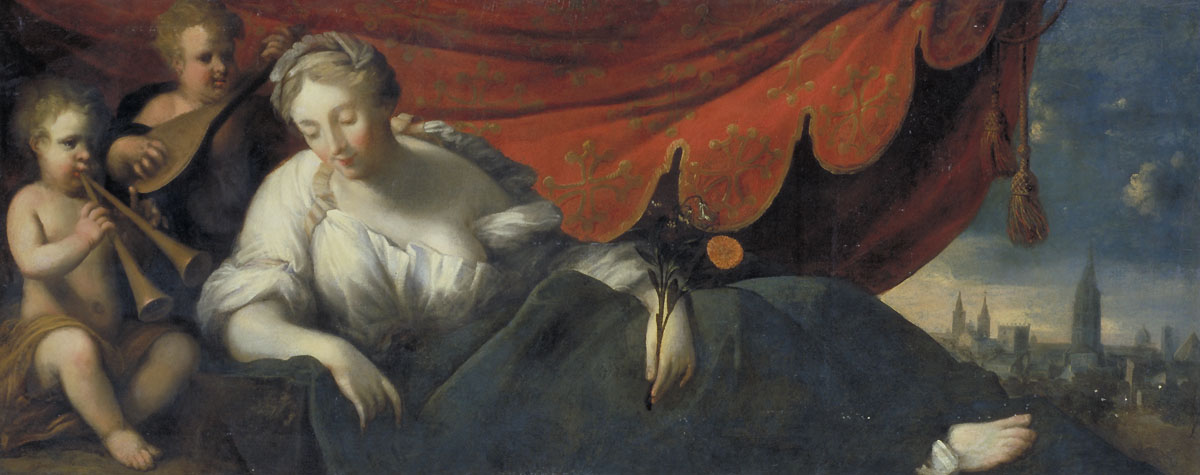
Jean-Pierre Rivalz, Clémence Isaure, Musée des Augustins

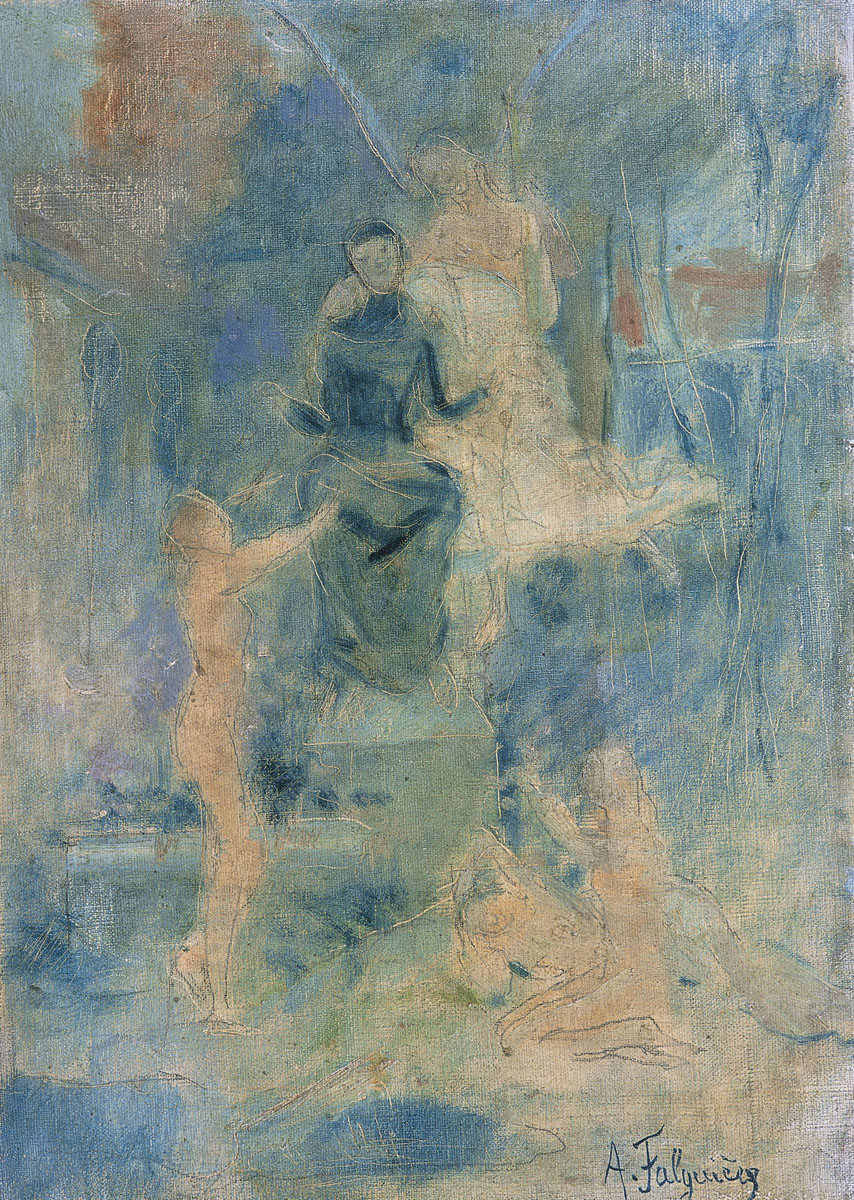
Alexandre Falguière, Clémence Isaure, Musée des Augustins

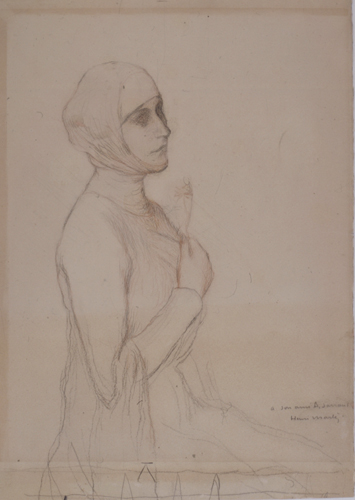
Henri Martin, Clémence Isaure, Musée Paul-Dupuy.

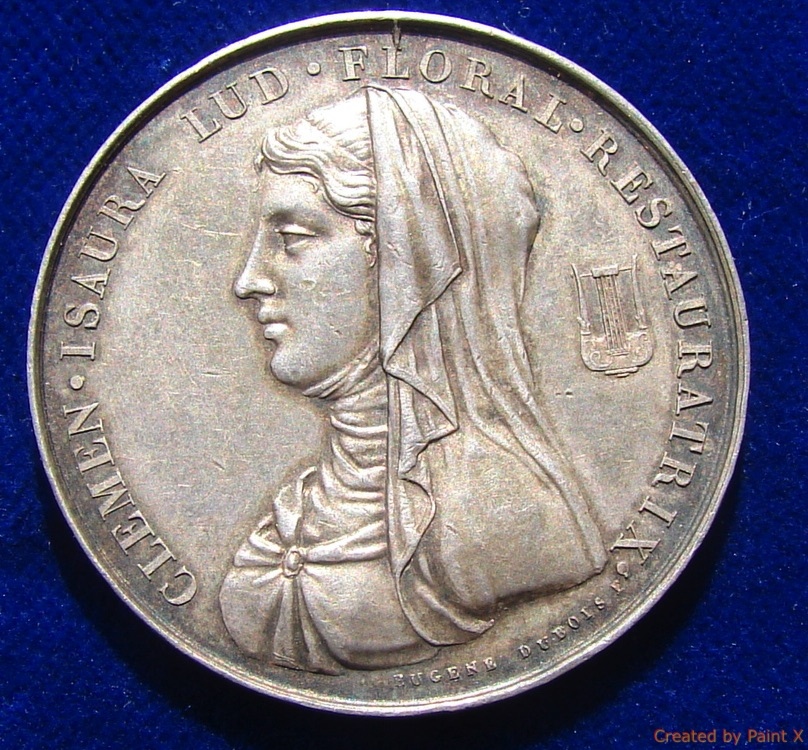
Médaille Toulouse 1819, Clémence Isaure, 1450 Toulouse - 1500, et les Jeux Floraux, verso

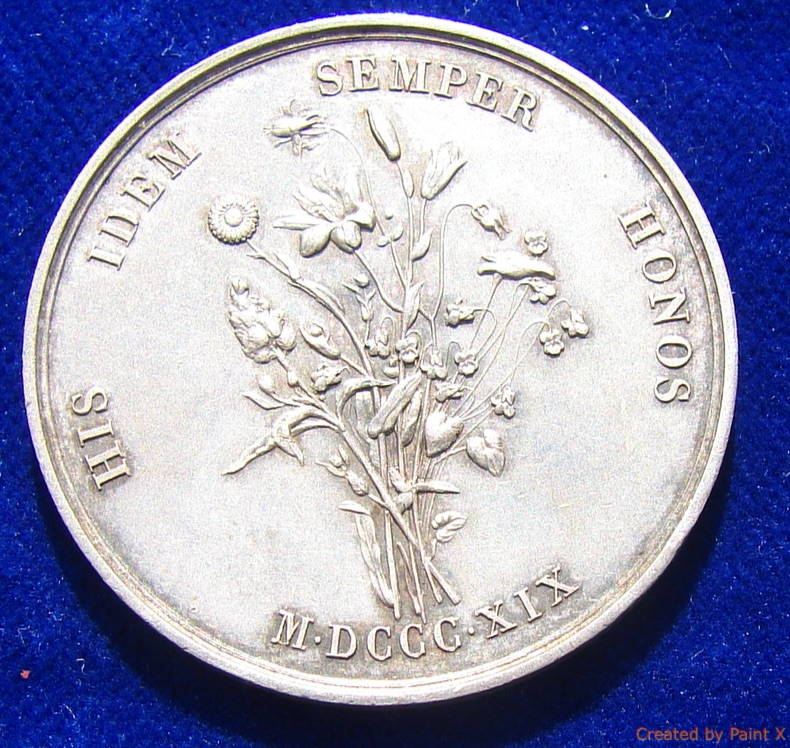
Médaille des Jeux Floraux à Toulouse 1819, recto

== Bibliography ==
- Jean-Pierre Claris de Florian (1891). Clémence Isaure. Paris: Imprimerie des Annales.
- Delmas, Jean-Jacques (1984). À Clémence Isaure. Saint-Germain-du-Bel-Air, France: Delmas Jean Jacques Éditions. p. 84. ISBN 978-2950031600.
- Boyer, Pierre-Louis (2010). Clémence Isaure, vérités sur une chimère toulousaine. Paris: Séguier (Nouvelles éd.). p. 100. ISBN 978-2-7588-0320-1.
