= Il pleut, il pleut, bergère =

French song

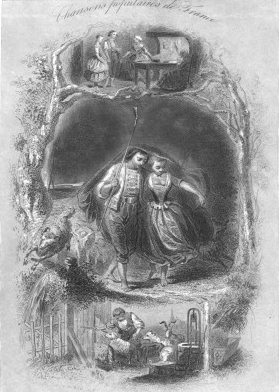
"Il pleut, il pleut, bergère", illustration published in 1866 in National and Popular Songs of France by Théophile Marion Dumersan

Il pleut, il pleut, bergère (French pronunciation: [il plø il plø bɛʁʒɛʁ], It's raining, it's raining, shepherdess) is a French song taken from the opéra comique in one act Laure et Pétrarque, written in 1780 by Fabre d'Églantine. The music was written by Louis-Victor Simon (1764–1820).

It was sung for the creation of the National Guard after the storming of the Bastille on 14 July 1789. Some years later, d'Églantine hummed it on his way to the guillotine. The shepherdess refers to Marie Antoinette and the rain and the coming storm to the troubles that led to the French Revolution.

The first title of the song was "Le Retour aux champs" ("Back to the fields") before getting its current title in 1787. It is also known as "The Storm".

In the final of the first act of the opera Barbe-Bleue (1866), Jacques Offenbach plays the first notes of the song while Barbe-Bleue shows the shepherdess Boulotte as his next wife.

Edmond Rostand introduced this song at the end of his drama L'Aiglon (1900). It can be heard in the 1937 opera that Arthur Honegger and Jacques Ibert based on this play.

== Lyrics ==
First verse of six and English translation:

Il pleut, il pleut bergère
Rentre tes blancs moutons
Allons sous ma chaumière
Bergère, vite allons
J'entends sous le feuillage
L'eau qui tombe à grand bruit.
Voici, venir l'orage,
Voici l'éclair qui luit.

It's raining, it's raining, shepherdess
Bring in your white sheep
Let's go into my cottage
Shepherdess, let's go soon
I hear under the foliage
The rain that falls with a great noise.
See the storm coming,
See the lightning that glows.
