= Léo Laporte-Blairsy =

French sculptor

- Born: 5 April 1865; Toulouse, France
- Died: April 1923; Paris, France
- Occupation: Sculptor

Léo Laporte-Blairsy (1865-1923) was a French sculptor.

Œuvres de Léo Laporte-Blairsy

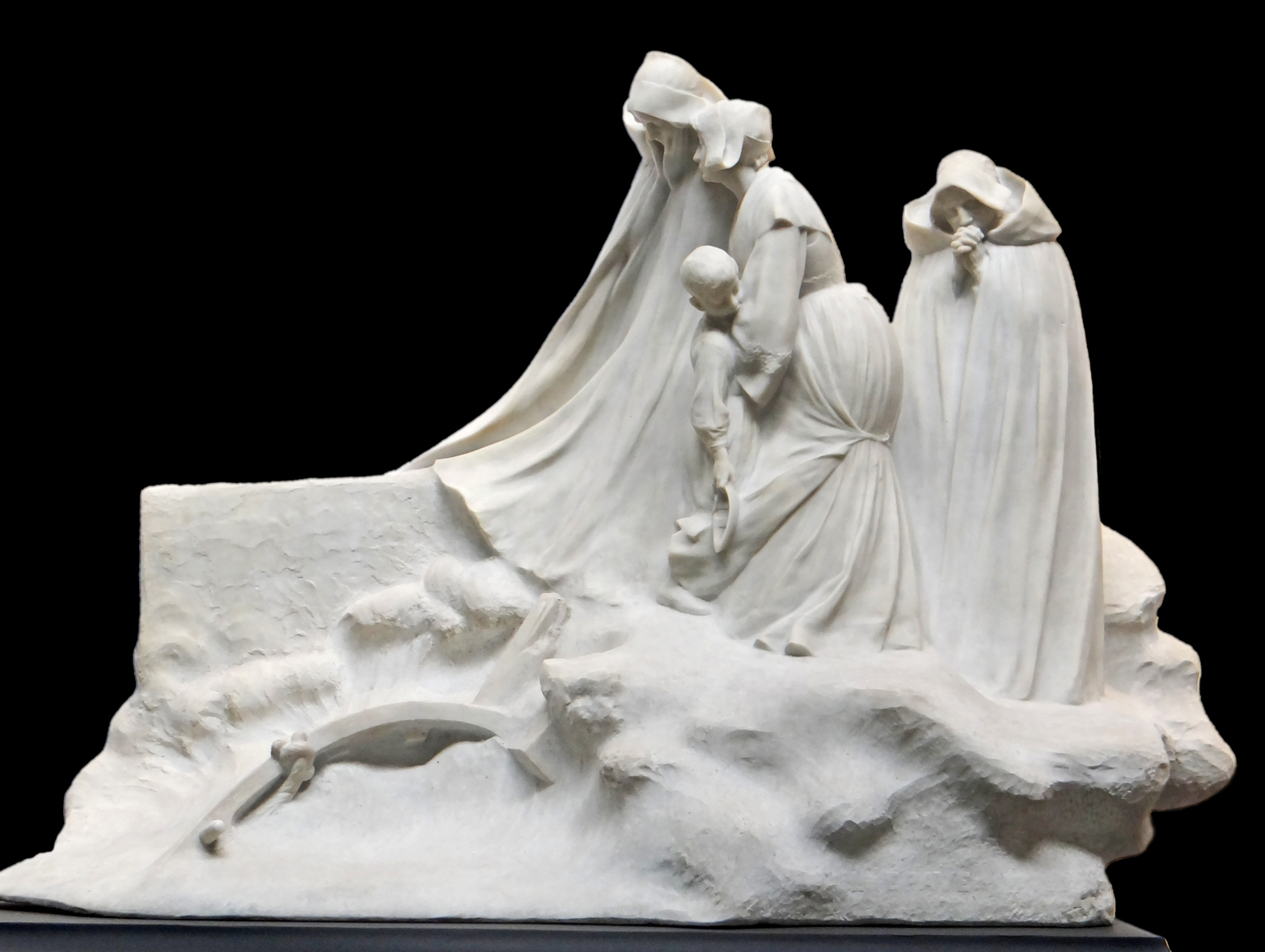
L'Épave (1907), musée des beaux-arts de Nantes.

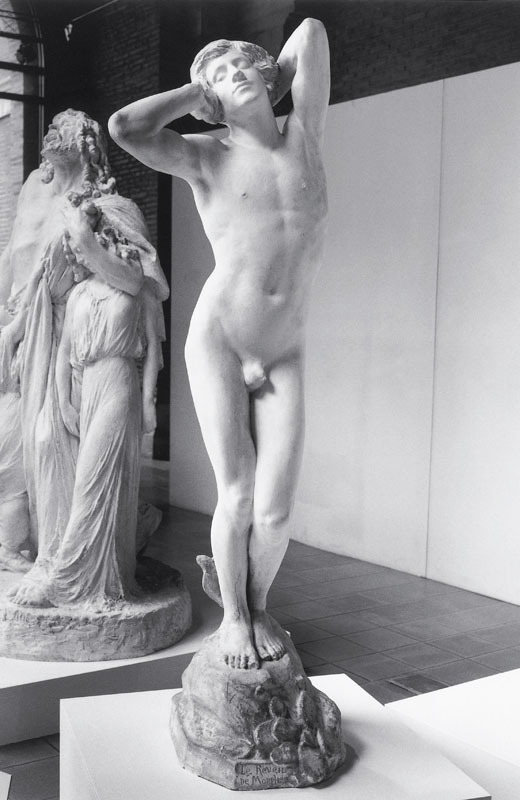
Le Réveil de Morphée (1894), Toulouse, musée des Augustins.

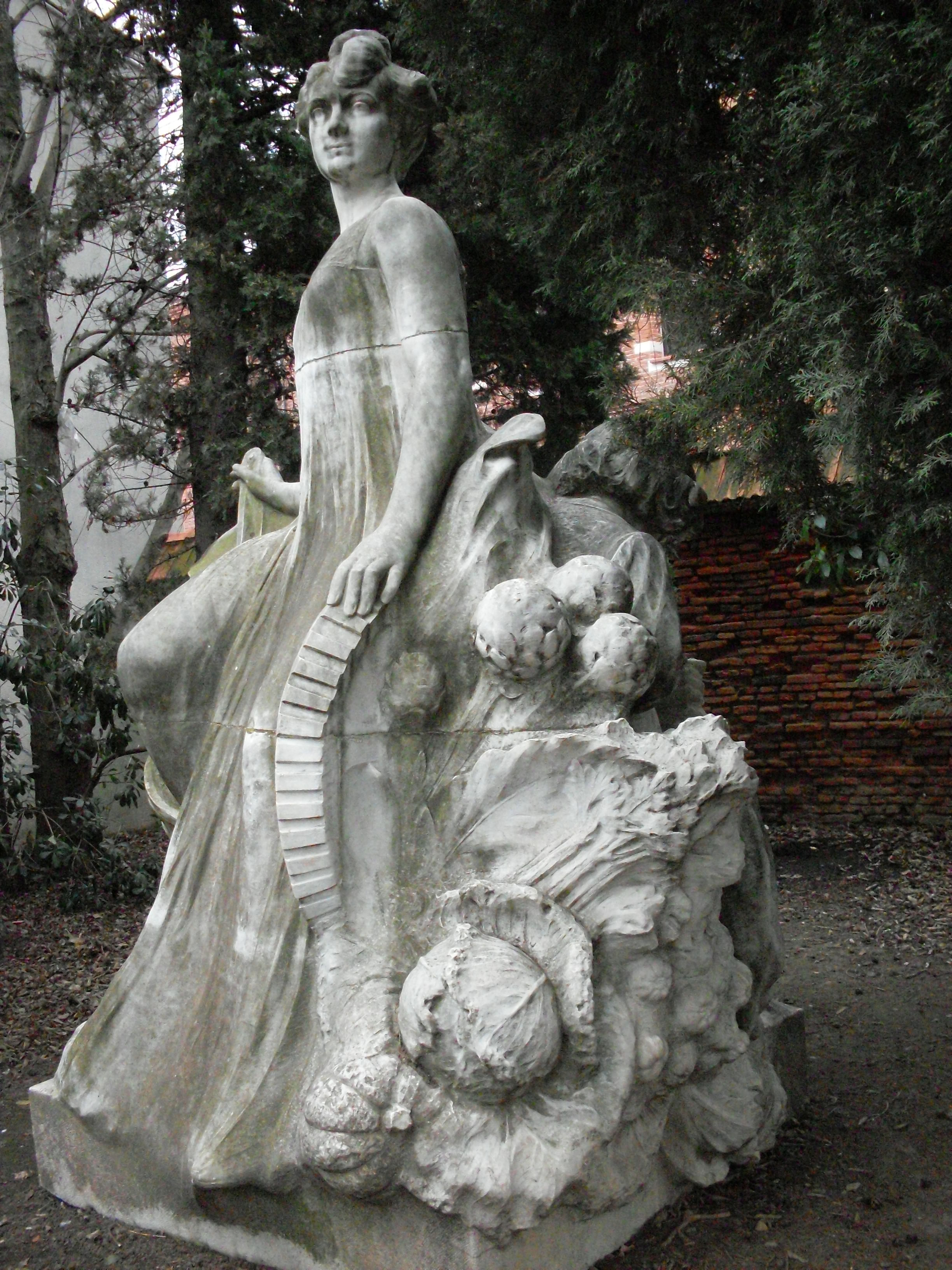
Le Faubourg Matabiau (1900), Toulouse, parc Michelet.

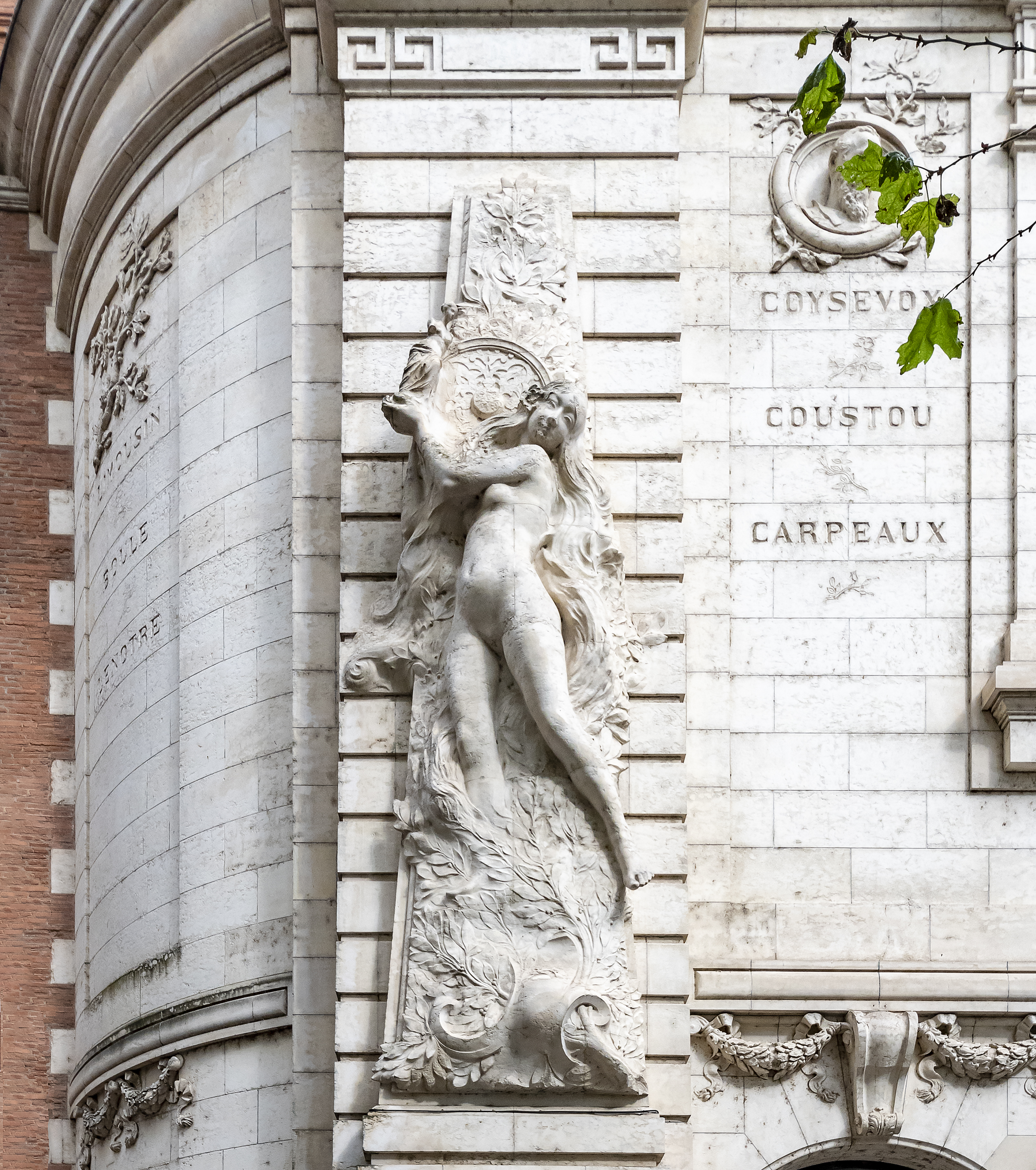
Allégorie de la sculpture 1896
Toulouse School of Fine Arts

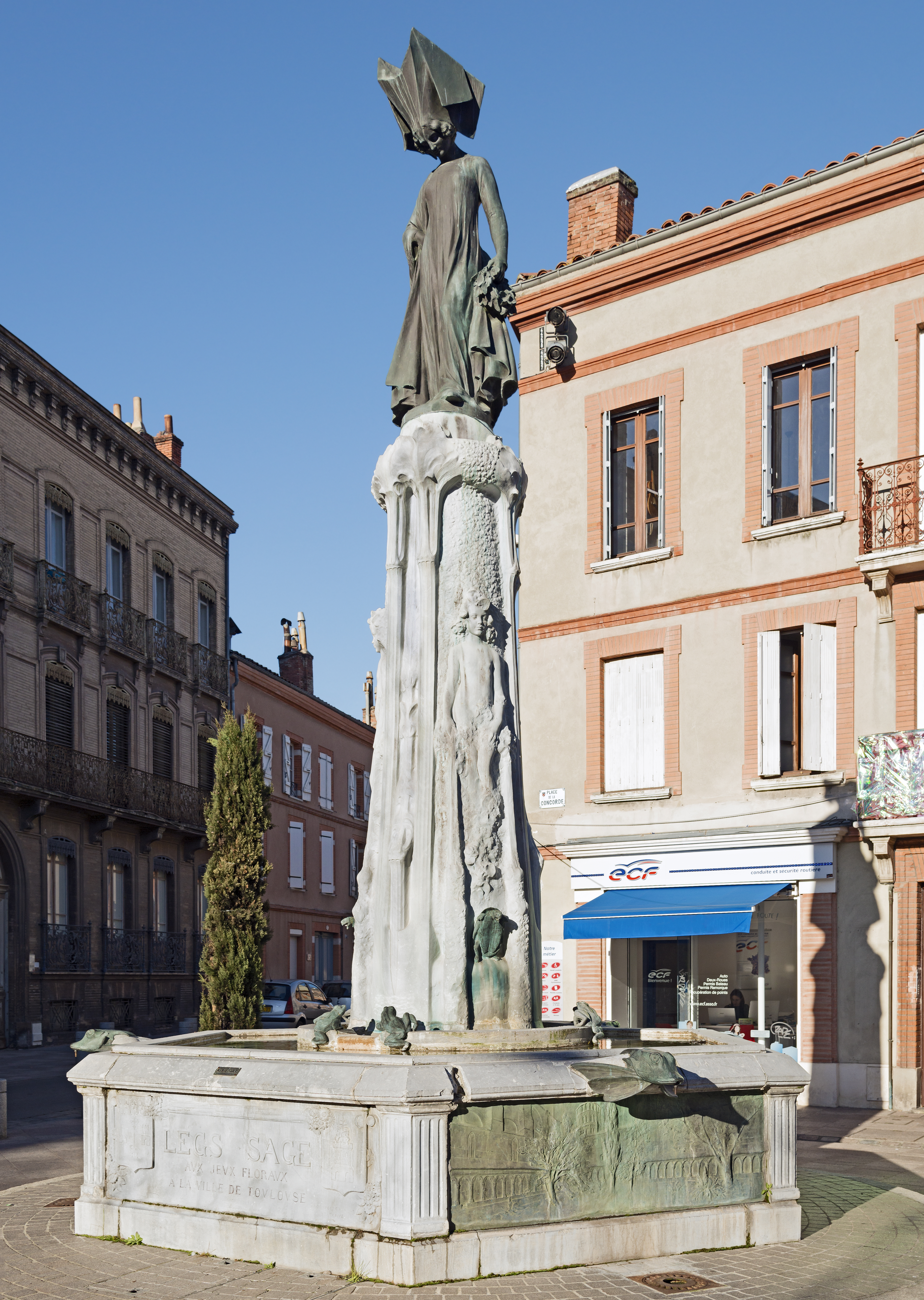
Aux jeux floraux ou La Poésie romane (1910), Toulouse
