= Soshana Afroyim =

Austrian painter (1927–2015)

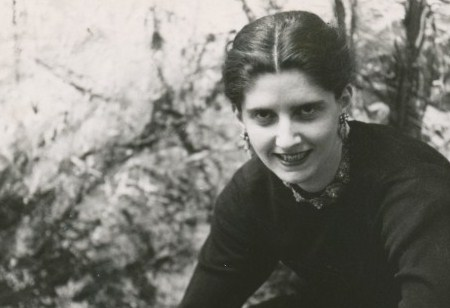
- Soshana Afroyim in her studio in Paris, 1956
- Born: Susanne Schüller; September 1, 1927; Vienna, Austria
- Died: December 9, 2015 (aged 88); Vienna, Austria
- Education: Northwood College; Chelsea Polytechnic School; University of Applied Arts Vienna; Academy of Fine Arts Vienna
- Known for: Painting
- Movement: Modernism
- Spouse: Beys Afroyim (m. 1945; div. 1950)
- Children: 1

Soshana Afroyim (born Susanne Schüller; September 1, 1927 – December 9, 2015) was an Austrian painter of the Modernism period. Soshana was a full-time artist and traveled frequently, exhibiting her work internationally. During her journeys, she portrayed many well known personalities and her art developed in different directions. Her early period artwork was largely naturalistic in nature, showing landscapes and portraits. Later her style developed towards abstract art, strongly influenced by Asian calligraphy.

== Early life ==
=== Childhood ===
Soshana Afroyim was born in 1927 as Susanne Schüller in Vienna, Austria, into a Jewish middle-class family. Her younger brother Maximilian was born two years later. Her father, Fritz Schüller, owned a cufflink factory and her mother, Margarethe Schüller, was a sculptor. Soshana first went to the Rudolf Steiner School, but soon changed to the alternative Schwarzwald School. She started to paint and draw at a very young age. Her mother supported Soshana's creativity and collected her works.

=== Fleeing Vienna ===
At the age of eleven, Soshana witnessed the annexation of Austria. "I watched Hitler's triumphant entry to Vienna. I remember well how I looked out of the window (...) and saw how he was welcomed by the cheering crowd as he drove in his open car (...). I turned cold and was horribly frightened."

The family decided to leave Austria. Fritz Schüller, who had been born in Brno, had a Czech passport and left the country first. Margarethe, Soshana and Maximilian fled to Switzerland, then Paris, where Fritz had waited for them and finally in 1939 they reached London, where they would stay two years. Soshana attended the Northwood College and in 1940 the Chelsea Polytechnic School, where she had painting and drawing lessons and learned about fashion design. Due to the Blitz, the Schueller family had to take refuge in air-raid shelters almost every night. The experience was very stressful for Soshana, which she later expressed through drawings.

=== Emigration to America ===
Soshana's father fled to Spain and via Tangier, followed by New York. In 1941 he managed to get an affidavit for his family and booked three tickets for the S.S. Madura, the last civil ship that would leave Europe. In 1941, Soshana, her mother, and her brother arrived at Ellis Island, in New York City. She enrolled at Washington Irving High School and attended painting classes under the guidance of artist Beys Afroyim, future plaintiff-appellant in Afroyim v. Rusk.

== Early career ==
=== Travelling through America ===
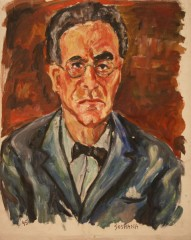
Otto Klemperer, Conductor; oil on canvas, painted by Soshana Afroyim, 1945

At the age of 17, she travelled against her parents' will with Beys Afroyim through America. To earn their living during these travels, they painted writers, musicians, statesmen and scientists like Thomas Mann, Franz Werfel, Otto Klemperer, Bruno Walter, Lion Feuchtwanger, Theodore Dreiser and Hanns Eisler.

When the United Nations Conference on International Organization opened in May 1945 in San Francisco, the couple portrayed well-known delegates, such as the deputy chairman of the UdSSR national planning commission Vasilij Vasilevič Kuznecov.

=== Cuba and the first large exhibition ===
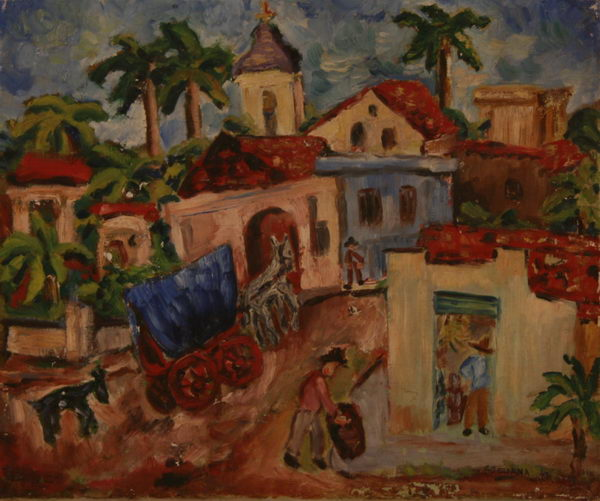
Outside Havana, oil on canvas, painted by Soshana, 1947

Because of Beys' activities within the Communist Party, the couple left the US and spent nine months in Cuba, where Soshana had her first exhibition in 1948 at the Circulo de Bellas Artes, Havana. From that time on she used the name "Soshana", the pen name Afroyims gave her, meaning "Lily" in Hebrew (the more common spelling is Soshana - שושנה). After a short stay in the US, they moved to Europe and eventually to Israel.

=== Vienna and Paris ===
==== Back to Vienna ====
Soshana returned to Vienna with her son and eventually gave Beys full custody. In 1950, she enrolled at the University of Applied Arts in Vienna and in 1952 to the Academy of Fine Arts Vienna, where she painted under the guidance of Prof. Sergius Pauser, Albert Paris Gütersloh and Prof. Herbert Boeckl. Unhappy with academic art practice, she relocated in Paris, France in 1952.

==== Paris ====
Upon relocation to Paris, Soshana lived and worked in the former studio of André Derain. She eventually moved into another studio at Impasse Ronsin next to Brâncuși. She became very close with the artist, whom she described as loving her "like a daughter." Later, she lived in another studio that was previously owned by Gauguin.

Soshana struggled financially as a full-time artist in Paris. She described it as a "bittersweet time." She became acquainted with the artists Kupka, Auguste Herbin, Ossip Zadkine, César, Pignon, Bazaine, Max Ernst, Yves Klein, Alexander Calder, Wifredo Lam, Sam Francis, Jean-Paul Sartre, Affandi, Lain Bangdel, and Marc Chagall. She considered Alberto Giacometti one of her best friends. In 1953, Soshana met the Zurich gallery owner Max G. Bollag, who became a major promoter of her work.

In Paris, Soshana had multiple exhibitions in the André Weil Gallery and Salon d'Automne, the Salon des Réalités Nouvelles and the Salon de Mai, where she met Pablo Picasso for the first time. He invited her to visit him at his Villa in Vallauris and drew a portrait of her in 1954.

=== World travel ===
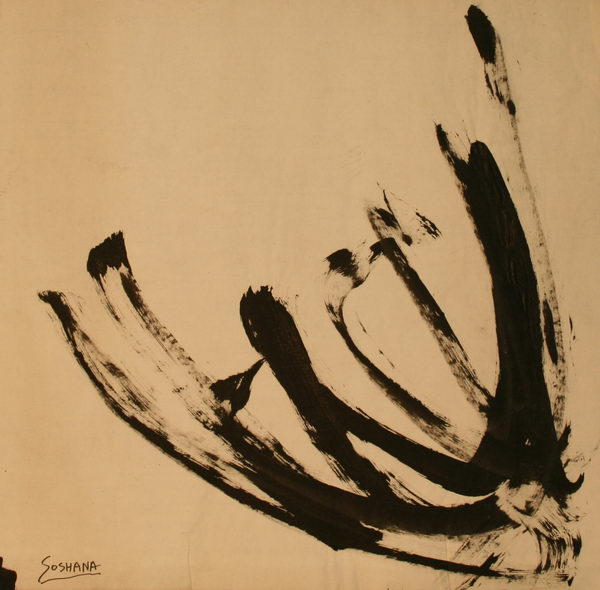
Kyoto, ink on paper, painted by Soshana, 1957

In 1956, Soshana traveled through Asia. She had organised herself an invitation for a Chinese Ministry of Culture to exhibit in Beijing. On her way to China, she visited India, Thailand, Cambodia and Japan, where she became inspired by Indian philosophy, Hinduism and Buddhism. She was impressed by the art of calligraphy and learned art techniques on xuan paper from Buddhist monks in Kyoto and Chinese painters in Hangzhou. The art of calligraphy became formative for her painting style. In 1957 she arrived in Beijing, where her exhibition took place in the Emperor's palace.

In 1959 Soshana travelled through Africa, where she portrayed Albert Schweitzer in Lambaréné, eventually returning to Paris.

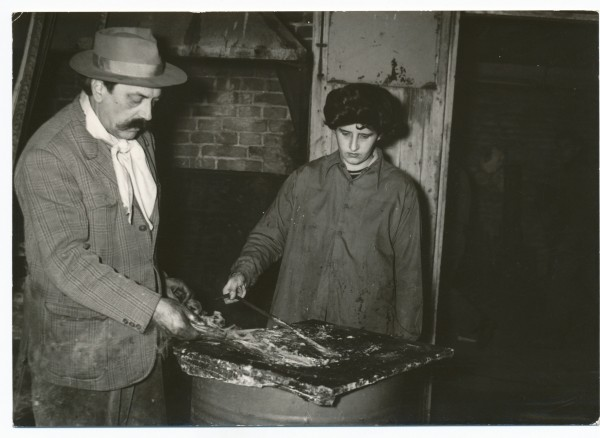
Pinot Gallizio and Soshana in Alba del Piemonte, Italy, 1960

In the same year, she became acquainted with the Italian artist Pinot Gallizio. They worked together in Paris and Alba del Piemonte, Italy. In a letter written by Gallizio, to his gallerist Otto and Heicke Van de Loo in Munich, he announced that "20 paintings were made in September 1959 in Paris, together with Soshana", adding "results formidable".

Through Gallizio, Soshana got in contact with the COBRA group, among others to Karel Appel and Asger Jorn. But because she was a woman, they did not accept her as a full member of the art group.

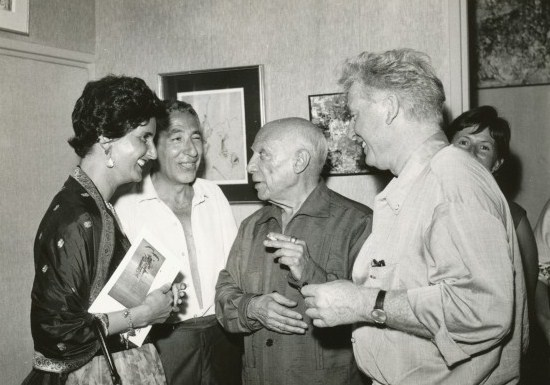
Soshana, André Verdet, Picasso and Pignon at the opening of the Soshana exhibition in the Château Grimaldi in Antibes, France, 1962

Instead, Soshana started a collaboration with the O´Hana Gallery in London, where she had three exhibitions in 1959, 1960 and 1963. In 1962, she held an exhibition at Château Grimaldi in Antibes.

=== Mexico ===
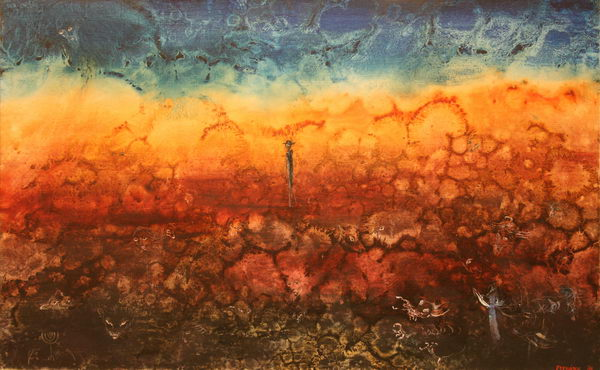
Alone in Mexico, oil on canvas, painted by Soshana, 1969

In 1964, Soshana traveled to Mexico for various exhibitions. She lived for many months in Cuernavaca, known as the "City of Eternal Spring" and a refuge for many artists and intellectuals of the 1960s. She became friends with Mexican artists such as Rufino Tamayo, Siqueiros, José Luis Cuevas and Mathias Goeritz. In 1965, she met Adolph Gottlieb for the first time and later in New York, they developed a deep friendship. In 1966, an exhibition of Soshana's work took place in the Palacio de Bellas Artes.

=== Second journey around the world ===
During the course of her second trip around the world in 1968, Soshana visited the South Seas, the Caribbean, Thailand, Bali, Australia, India, Sikkim, Nepal, Afghanistan, Iran and Israel. In 1969, the Chogyal entrusted her with painting portraits of the king and the queen of Sikkim and the same year she became a member of the Theosophical Society.

In 1972, Soshana moved to Jerusalem, where she planned four exhibitions in the Old Jaffa Gallery. However, when the Yom Kippur War broke out, they were all cancelled. Soshana left Israel and moved to New York in 1974.

=== New York ===
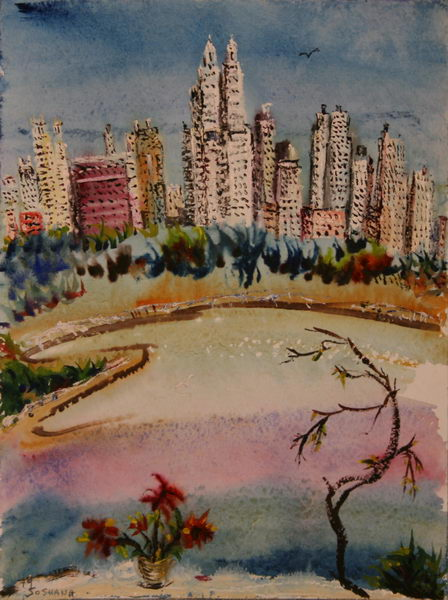
NY Central Park, gouache on paper, painted by Soshana, 1975

From 1974 to 1985, she lived and worked in New York City. Before she moved into her studio in Queens, she stayed in the Chelsea Hotel in Manhattan, where she was able to pay her rent with paintings. Soshana knew many people of the New York art scene, like Mark Rothko, Francesco Clemente, Joseph Hirshhorn and her close friend Adolph Gottlieb. Despite gaining international attention for her work and exhibiting frequently, Soshana felt unsatisfied with her living situation and uncomfortable in New York. She returned to Vienna in 1985.

=== Return to Vienna ===
Upon her return to Vienna, she continued to travel until she had to stop due to health problems in 2005. Thereafter, she moved to a nursing home and continued to paint. She died on December 9, 2015. Her son, Amos, serves as her manager and promoter. In 2008, the Austrian National Library took over her creative estate, comprising manuscripts, photos, letters, documents etc. and made it available for public consultation.

== Work ==
=== Early years ===
In her early work, Soshana links individual elements from the tradition of Fauvism with the compact, hermetic view of American Realism and is noticeably imbued with a spirit of youthful insouciance.

Soshana received her first lasting artistic influences at an art school in New York City, starting at the age of fourteen. Before she started to create abstract paintings in the early 1950s, she painted in a style of colorful, archaizing Realism. A style, which is connected to the political art in the period around 1945, as a minor transition phase between the earlier and more famous Realisms of the 1930s (New Objectivity, Verismo, Precisionism, Magical Realism, etc.) and the abstract painting of the 1950s. Already the bombings of the London Blitz, had triggered artistic reflections in the drawing of the budding artist Soshana. Her teacher in New York and later husband Beys Afroyim, who was a committed Communist, led her much deeper into narrative art and contemporary Social Realism. Afroyim and Soshana were very involved in the political activistic New York art circles, consisting mainly of European immigrants.

On her travels with Beys Afroyim through the US and later Cuba, Israel and Europe, Soshana painted street sceneries (e.g. Old Street in NY City, 1943, or Street in L.A., 1945), factory workers (e.g. the series My Sweatshop in New York, 1944), people she met on the way (e.g. Two Black Youths, 1944, oder Young Man with a Straw, 1945) and many landscapes. Furthermore, she portrayed many artists and politicians (e.g. Franz Werfel on his deadbed, 1945, or Otto Klemperer, 1945). These portraits reflect the critical intellectual environment that the Afroyim couple moved in. All of the persons depicted have a distinctly melancholic look and are all either frontal or three-quarter-view portraits, which focus completely on the person represented. From the perspective of bold Social Realism, she interpreted the psychology of European immigrants in Los Angeles and European delegates to the founding conference of the United Nations in San Francisco. Soshanas working-class milieu studies on the other hand show a high affinity with famous regionalists and socialrealists such as Thomas Hart Benton, Grant Wood, the Soyer Brothers or the Mexican Muralists José Clemente Orozco and Diego Rivera.

Up to 1948, Soshana remained faithful to a compact, colorful and expressive Social Realism. In these early paintings, figures are modeled roughly with a few broad brush strokes without any detail; landscapes and cityscapes are open to the beholder from a slightly elevated point of view. The scenes appear mostly in a neutral light, with neither houses nor figures casting shadows. These landscapes with the saturated application of colors, exude an almost cheerful mood, which can be interpreted as an echo of Fauvism. Soshana's paintings of European Alpine landscapes, which she began creating upon her return to Vienna in 1951, already show her first steps into Art Informel.

=== Paris, Asia and the Art Informel ===
When Soshana moved to Paris in 1952, she became part of the so-called École de Paris, a representative of the Paris School.

Influenced by the intense contact with other artists from all over the world, Soshana turned her style from Expressive Realism into the Informel. Step by step she eliminated the object from her paintings and followed suit with the international art jargon of the time after 1945. Her Paris paintings are being connected with Abstract Expressionism and compared by experts to those of Jackson Pollock, Georges Mathieu and Hans Hartung.

From the second half of the 1950s, Soshanas works increasingly show informel characteristics. Like so many other artists of her time, she was fascinated by Asian calligraphic aesthetics and the philosophy behind it. She had many Asian friends in Paris (e.g. Tobashi, Fujino, Walasse Ting) and made her first experiments with calligraphic techniques. But the decisive impulse for an intense engagement in studies of traditional Far Eastern art was her first journey to Asia in 1957. She learned how to use Chinese ink on paper and soon applied the new technique on her oil paintings.

Although she devoted a big part of her work to the abstract art, Soshana never completely gave up the representational and kept interweaving occasional figures into her paintings.

=== Mexico and the Abstract Surrealism ===
Many of Soshana's paintings contain Surrealistic motives, like an infinite horizon, expanded endless spaces, in which mysterious shapes, masks or heads seem to float. The use of an Surrealistic language is due to Soshana's travels to Mexico. In 1960 she made her first visit to that country, which was – due to its political antifaschist position - at that time particularly appealing for artists and intellectuals from Europe.

Soshana is one of those "children of the language of painting in Mexico", a "pintora filomexicana". All her life she had a deep and magic connection with the country, which is also reflected in her work. The paintings she created in Mexico or are reminiscent of Mexico have a very special character, they hold within the typical flamboyant colors and the contrasts of that country. Soshana refined a technique, she once had developed by chance in her Paris studio years before, when it had rained through the leaky glass roof onto her watercolours and dried, leaving bright spots with dark edges. Soshana began to imitate this effect with turpentine on her oil paintings, the result was a "kind of drip painting in reverse" which resembled the structure of liquid crystal, as she describes herself: "Some biochemists say that my paintings resemble what you see, when you look into a microscope"

=== Loneliness and Pain ===
A lonely figure, a dark silhouette or a single head between heavy bars, surrounded by wild strokes inside the perspective of a tunnel – motives like these run like a red thread through Soshanas whole work and have earned her a reputation as "Cassandra of the canvas, a prophetess of doom, an artist of the Atomic Age, a painter of anxiety and loneliness, of disease and dementia, of unemployment, pain, and death." (The Mainichi, Japan 1957)

=== Political works ===
Soshana was seriously affected by political events since her childhood. At the age of 11, she watched Hitler marching into Vienna, later the family had to flee from the Nazi regime. Soshana used drawing and painting as an outlet to deal with these traumatic events, like in a drawing, she called "Hitler as Cloun". Themes like The Cold War, the Yom Kippur War, the Atomic Age or terrorism can be found over and over again in Soshana's Oeuvre. When she returned to Vienna in 1985, she worked up the time of the Nazi regime and the Holocaust. During Kurt Waldheim's election campaign in 1987/88, she made a series of paintings and collages, in which she incorporated Nazi propaganda texts. Soshana also painted motive cycles of the wars in Yugoslavia, the attacks on the World Trade Center or the wars on Iraq.

=== Late work ===
Reminiscences on earlier series of works and a process of compression can be clearly noted in Soshana's late work.

From the 2000s on, her paintings change character. The structures are more quiet, the colours clearer and the forms are more simple.

=== Works (selection) ===
A complete overview over Soshanas works can be found on the homepage.

- 1944: Workers in a N.Y. Sweatshop, Oil on Canvas, 40,5 x 48 cm
- 1955: Artists in Paris, Oil on Canvas, 73 x 100 cm
- 1957: Maroque Marrakesch, Oil on Canvas, 60 x 55 cm
- 1963: Chinese Tiger, Oil on Canvas, 96 x 162 cm
- 1972: Terrorist in Munich, Oil on Canvas, 115 x 72 cm
- 1981: Rainbow, Oil on Canvas, 101 x 76 cm
- 1988: Concentration Camp, Acryl on Canvas, 116 x 74 cm
- 1990: Memories of Mexico, Oil on Canvas, 80 x 115 cm
- 1992: Chorramshar- Iraq, Oil on Canvas, 75,5 x 115 cm
- 2004: Movement V., Acryl on Canvas, 40 x 60 cm
- 2007: Life, Oil on Canvas, 60 x 40 cm

== Personal life ==
In 1945, Soshana and Beys Afroyim married. In 1946, their only child Amos was born in New York.The family was financially poor and Soshana didn't want to live her life as a traditional housewife. They divorced in 1950 with mutual consent. She returned with her son to Vienna in 1951.

== Reception ==
=== Soshana in the context of Austrian Modernism ===
Soshana worked internationally in U.S., Israel, France, Mexico, South America, India, Japan, China, and Africa. This is why she largely has been denied recognition within the context of 20th-century Austrian art; the foreign press paradoxically always has seen her as an Austrian painter. Today she is often labelled as a cosmopolitan, a globetrotter, whose work is influenced by experiences on all the continents.

"...ranging in style from more or less abstract impressionism to tachistic calligraphy, Soshana´s paintings represent a diary of her travels showing, page by page, the impressions and visual experiences evoked on her journeys." (Pierre Restany, art historian and art critic, Paris 1969)

=== Soshana's position as a woman in the art world ===
"A woman who creates art lives in a test situation, and the examiner can be anyone at all. Because every man and every woman 'knows' what a woman is; therefore every man and every woman can claim the right to reduce the assessment of a woman's art to what she is like as a woman."

At Soshana's time, an art career for a woman was by no means a matter of course. The goal of being able to support oneself by one's own art production seemed – not only for women – nearly impossible, which is why many aspiring women artists completed practical training in some other profession parallel to their art schooling. In most cases it was the teaching profession, which they practiced in art-related spheres. But Soshana chose her own independent self-determined and emancipated way, in an era in which the legal implementation of equal rights of men and women and equal opportunities to work in any profession was simply unthinkable.

In a letter to the co-author of her autobiography, she writes about her role as a pioneer: "This is why I want to write this book, to say what a struggle I went through to be a woman and an artist and be maybe like 100 years ahead of the times we actually live in."

In late 1940s to late 1950s, a revolutionary artist group like CoBrA, refused her as a member out of sexistic reasons. And the gallerist of her colleague Pinot Gallizio, with whom she made many paintings, did not want her to sign with Gallizio on the same work.

In the manuscript of her autobiography, Soshana writes about the rejection she encountered also by other gallery owners: "The owner of the Galerie de France told me in no uncertain terms, that they did not like to take woman artists on contract, it was considered too risky. A woman could get married, have children and abandon her career. Twenty years of publicity and a long-term financial investment in a female artist would be ruined over-night. Since this did not apply in my case, I felt the discrimination against women all the more."

For a very long time, the role of a woman in arts was to be an inspiring muse, not to be a painter herself. But Soshana understood that she had to develop her own individual, unique artist image and knew very well how to practice successful self-management. She spread exciting, mysterious stories of her life and created a hype around her person. Her encounters with Picasso were told again and again - especially the story of the day, when she visited him in his villa in Vallauris, to be portrayed and the refused his invitation to stay with him. Soshana tried to use Picassos name to get more attention. The planned book title of a never finished autobiographical novel would have referred to that event: The Girl who said No to Picasso.

Still Soshana later mentioned very often that she was torn between her pride of having said "No" and the regret, not to have chosen the easier and safe way at the side of a man.

== Awards ==
- March 2008: Österreichische Post (Austrian Post) issued the commemorative stamp "Soshana" in the series "Modern Art in Austria"
- 2 September 2009: Gold Merit Award of the Province of Vienna
- 27 May 2010: Austrian Cross of Honour for Science and Art

== Legacy ==
In March 2008, presentation of the special stamp "Soshana" in the series "Modern Art in Austria"

In September 2011 seven Soshana paintings were stolen from a private collection in Vienna

Soshana worked for several years on her autobiography with co-author Toby Falk. It was never finished nor published. The manuscript is in possession of her son Amos Schueller.

Everywhere alone. The Artist Soshana is a 45-minute documentary directed and produced by Werner Müller. It is based on Soshana's biography, and was filmed in Vienna, Paris, Mexico and New York. It contains interviews with the artist herself, with friends, acquaintances and contemporaries. The documentary was broadcast in December 2013 on 3Sat.

== Exhibitions (selection) ==
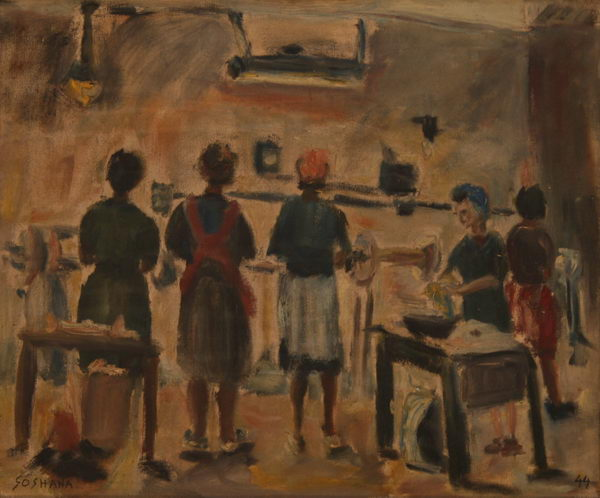
Workers in a New York sweatshop, painted by Soshana, 1944

- 1948: Circulo de Bellas Artes, Havanna
- 1957: Imperial Palace, Beijing
- 1960: Museo de Arte, São Paulo
- 1961: Soshana, Musée Picasso, Antibes
- 1966: National Museum of Modern Art, Mexico City
- 1973: Old Jaffa Gallery, Israel
- 1976: Modern Art Centre, Zurich
- 1982: Horizon Gallery, New York
- 1997: Soshana-Retrospective, Palais Pálffy, Vienna
- 1998: Lentos Museum, Linz, Austria
- 1999: Musée Matisse, Le Cateau-Cambrésis, France
- 2006: Book Presentation, Jewish Museum, Vienna
- 2007: Siddhartha Art Gallery, Kathmandu, Nepal; Agora Gallery, New York; Givatayim Theater, Israel
- 2008: Khalil Sakakini Cultural Center, Ramallah, Westbank; City Council of Lima, Pancho Fierro Art Gallery, Peru
- 2009: Yeshiva University Museum, New York; National Bank of Serbia, Belgrade; UCLA Hillel Museum, Los Angeles
- 2012: Lilly's Art, Vienna; exhibition on the occasion of Soshana's 85th birthday
- 2013: Exhibition at the Art Center of the Bahrain National Museum
- 2013: Austrian National Library, Vienna: "Night over Austria. The annexation 1938 - Flight and expulsion", group exhibition; 75 years after the Austrian Anschluss to Nazi Germany, the ONB shows the estates of emigrated Austrian artists.
- 2013: Exhibition at the Galicia Jewish Museum Kraków, Poland
- 2013: National Library of Austria, Vienna
- 2013: Gallery Art Couture Dubai, UAE
- 2013: Al-Babtain Library Kuwait
- 2014: Gallery del Ponte Turin, Italy
- 2014: Gallery Szaal, Vienna
- 2015: Theater Nestroyhof/Hamakom, Vienna
- 2015: Deutschvilla Strobl at Wolfgangsee, Austria
- 2015: Gallery Lendnine, Graz
- 2016: Gallery Art Couture Dubai, UAE
- 2017: Kunsthall Oslo with Edvard Munch Museum Oslo, Norway
- 2017: Austrian Cultural Forum in Istanbul, Turkey
- 2017: Austrian Cultural Forum New Delhi, India
- 2017: Austrian Cultural Forum London, UK
- 2018: Made in Art Gallery Venice, Italy
- 2018: Galerie ART nou mil.lenni, Barcelona, Spain
- 2019: Stadtgalerie Kitz-Art, Kitzbühel, Austria
- 2019: Kleine Galerie, Vienna, Austria
- 2019: Weltmuseum Wien, Heldenplatz, Vienna, Austria
- 2019: Shanghai Art Collection Museum, China
- 2020: Amart Galerie – Austrian Modern Art, Vienna, Austria
- 2020: Deutschvilla Strobl, Strobl am Wolfgangsee, Austria
- 2021: Fondazione Centro Giacometti, Switzerland
- 2021: Deutschvilla Strobl, Strobl am Wolfgangsee, Austria
- 2022: Palais Palffy, Vienna, Austria
- 2022: Deutschvilla Strobl, Strobl am Wolfgangsee, Austria
- 2022: Never at Home, Vienna, Austria
- 2022: Legenstein & Partner, Vienna, Austria
- 2022: Albertina Modern: "Ways of Freedom", Vienna, Austria
- 2023: Kleine Galerie, Vienna, Austria
- 2023: Deutschvilla Strobl, Strobl am Wolfgangsee, Austria
- 2024: Hessen Kassel Heritage, Kassel, Germany

== Museums ==
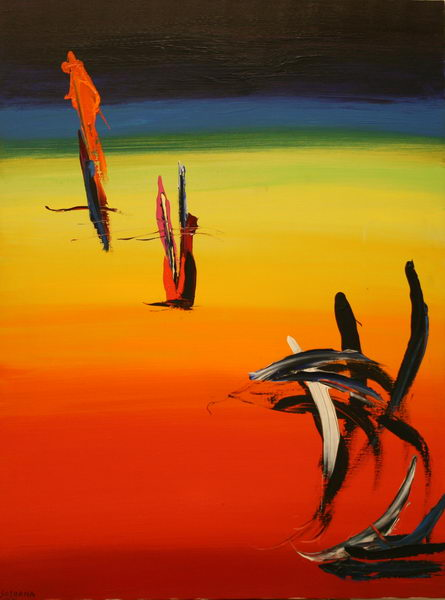
Rainbow, Special edition stamp "Soshana" of the collection "Modern art in Austria" 2008, oil on canvas, painted by Soshana, 1981

- Albertina, Graphics Collection, Vienna
- Museum of Modern Art, Paris
- Museum of Modern Art, Rome
- Museum of Modern Art, Rio de Janeiro
- Museum of Modern Art, São Paulo
- Museum of Modern Art, Mexico
- Museum of Modern Art, New Delhi
- Museum of Fine Arts, Santa Fé
- Bezalel Museum, Jerusalem
- The Israel Museum, Jerusalem
- Helena Rubinstein Museum, Tel Aviv
- Jewish Museum, New York
- Leo Baeck Institute, New York
- New York Hospital, New York
- Stamford Museum, Connecticut
- Salisbury Art Gallery, Rhodesia
- Farleigh Dickenson University, New Jersey
- Hirschhorn Museum, Washington, DC
- Musée Matisse, Nice
- Musée Picasso, Antibes
- Petit Palais, Geneva
- Neue Galerie, Linz, Austria
- Oberbank Wien

== Publications ==
- Karin Jilek: Die Künstlerin Soshana "A broken childhood" (The artist Soshana - "A broken childhood")

in: Fetz/Fingernagel/Leibnitz/Petschar/Pfunder (eds.): Nacht über Österreich. Der Anschluss 1938 – Flucht und Vertreibung (Night over Austria. The annexation 1938 - Flight and Expulsion). Publication on the occasion of an exhibition with the same title at the State Hall of the Austrian National Library, 7.3. - 28.4.2013, Residenz Publishing House 2013

- Lisa Bolyos, Katharina Morawek (eds.): Diktatorpuppe zerstört, Schaden gering. Kunst und Geschichtspolitik im Postnazismus

(Dictator doll destroyed, damage low. Arts and Political History in the Postnazi Era). A book about artists, scientists and activists in search of cultural strategies to disturb Postnazism. On page 50/51: A text about Soshana, Mandelbaum Publishing House 2012, ISBN 978-3-85476-391-8

- Birgit Prunner: Soshana. Das Malerische Oevre der 1950er und 1960er Jahre im Licht der internationalen Avantgarde, Diploma Thesis History of Art, University Vienna 2011
- Amos Schueller, Angelica Bäumer (eds.): Soshana. Life and Work. Comprehensive monograph on Soshanas life and work, contributing authors: Matthias Boeckl, Afnan Al-Jaderi, Christian Kircher, Marlene Streeruwitz, Martina Pippal, Christian Kloyber et al., Springer, Vienna, New York 2010, ISBN 978-3-7091-0274-9
- Martina Gabriel, Amos Schueller (eds.): Soshana. An Overview of Soshana's Works, contributing authors: Peter Baum, Max Bollag, Walter Koschatzky, et al., Vienna 2005
- Amos Schueller (ed.): Soshana. Paintings and Drawings 1945 – 1997, exhibition catalog of the Retrospective 1997, Palais Pallfy, Vienna 1997
- United Artists Ltd. (ed.): Soshana, comprehensive illustrated book, contributing authors: Jean Cassou, Michel Georges-Michel, Waldemar George, Pierre Restany, Tel Aviv 1973
- Fetz/ Fingernagel/ Leibnitz/ Petschar/ Pfundner (ed.): Night over Austria. The annexation 1938 -–Flight and Expulsion, Exhibitioncatalogue to Night over Austria. The annexation 1938 - Flight and Expulsion, at the Austrian National Library in Vienna, (7.3.-28.4.2013), Residenz Verlag, Vienna 2013
