= Fuss =

Fuss (German for foot) refer to:

- 4778 Fuss, a main-belt asteroid
- Fuss (surname), a surname
- Fuss Pot, a fictional character

== See also ==
- Fuss Peak
- Tadeusz Fuss-Kaden
