= Parmelin =

Parmelin is a surname. Notable people with the surname include:

- Guy Parmelin (born 1959), Swiss politician
- Hélène Parmelin (1915–1998), French novelist, journalist and art critic
