= Neocrepidodera transsilvanica =

Scientific classification
- Kingdom: Animalia
- Phylum: Arthropoda
- Class: Insecta
- Order: Coleoptera
- Suborder: Polyphaga
- Infraorder: Cucujiformia
- Family: Chrysomelidae
- Subfamily: Galerucinae
- Tribe: Alticini
- Genus: Neocrepidodera
- Species: N. transsilvanica

Binomial name
- Neocrepidodera transsilvanica (Fuss, 1864)

Synonyms
- Asiorestia transsilvanica Fuss, 1864; Crepidodera transsilvanica (Fuss, 1864)

Species of beetle

Neocrepidodera transsilvanica is a species of flea beetle from the Chrysomelidae family that can be found in Poland, Romania, Slovakia, and Ukraine.
