= Leo Schidlof =

Austrian art dealer

Leo R. Schidlof (1886–October 17, 1966 in London) was an Austrian art dealer, art expert and collector.

== Career ==
In the 1920s, Schidlof ran Leo Schidlof's art auction house (Kunstauktionshaus, also known as the Leo Schidlof Art Auction Salon) in Vienna and Paris. He was particularly interested in miniature painting. He became a leading expert in this field and presented a four-volume encyclopedia of European miniature painters from the 16th to 19th centuries. His Paris gallery was located at 61 avenue Victor Emmanuel III. From 1921 to 1925 Ferdinand Spany was managing director at the Schidlof's art auction house.

The OSS Art Looting Investigation Unit suspected Schidlof of selling artworks to German buyers during the Nazi occupation of France and included him in their Red Flag List of Names.

Beginning in 1946 Schidlof lived in London where he died in 1966.

As well as his work as a frequently cited expert on miniatures, Schidlof supplied drawings to the British Museum and many other institutions, including the Cleveland Museum of Art, the Metropolitan Museum of Art, and museums in Nuremberg.

== Publications ==
- Die Bildnisminiatur in Frankreich im XVII., XVIII. und XIX. Jahrhundert. Als Anhang: Allgemeines Lexikon der Miniaturisten aller Länder. Beyer, Wien 1911.
- Katalog der internationalen Miniaturen-Ausstellung in der Albertina. Wien, Mai–Juni 1924. Wien 1924.
- Chefs-d'oeuvre de la miniature et de la gouache. Genève, Musée d'art et d'histoire, 23.6.-15.8.1956. Genf 1956
- The miniature in Europe in the 16th, 17th, 18th, and 19th centuries. 4 Bände. Akademische Druck- und Verlagsanstalt, Graz 1964 (englische Ausgabe) = La miniature en Europe aux 16e, 17e, 18e et 19e siècles. 4 Bände. Akademische Druck- und Verlagsanstalt, Graz 1964 (französische Ausgabe).

== Literature ==
- Walter Koschatzky: Faszination Kunst. Erinnerungen eines Kunsthistorikers. Böhlau, Wien 2001, S. 211ff.
