= Girl in White =

1890 oil painting by Vincent van Gogh

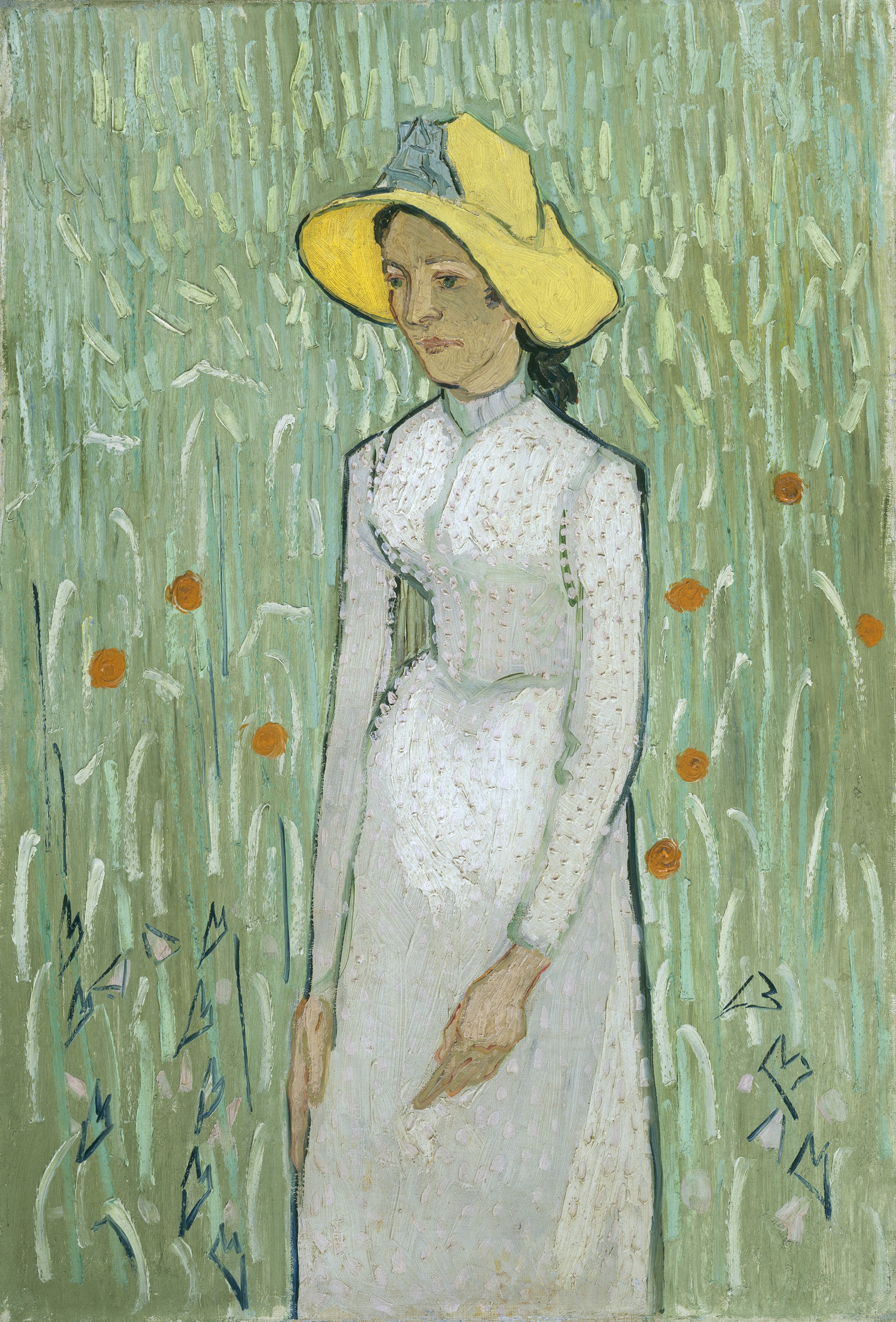
- Artist: Vincent van Gogh
- Year: 1890
- Medium: Oil on canvas
- Dimensions: 66.7 cm × 45.8 cm (26.3 in × 18.0 in)
- Location: National Gallery of Art; Washington, D.C.

Girl in White (also known as Young Girl Standing Against a Background of Wheat and Woman in a Cornfield) was painted by Vincent van Gogh in 1890 in Auvers-sur-Oise, France, during the last months of his life. Girl in White has been part of the Chester Dale Collection in the National Gallery of Art, Washington D.C. since 1963.

== Auvers-sur-Oise ==
In May 1890, Van Gogh traveled from Saint-Rémy to Paris where he had a three-day stay with his brother, Theo, Theo's wife Johanna and their new baby Vincent. Van Gogh found that unlike his past experiences in Paris, he was no longer used to the commotion of the city and was too agitated to paint. His brother, Theo and artist Camille Pissarro developed a plan for Van Gogh to go to Auvers-sur-Oise with a letter of introduction for Dr. Paul Gachet, a homeopathic physician and art patron who lived in Auvers. Van Gogh had a room at the inn Auberge Ravoux in Auvers and was under the care and supervision of Dr. Gachet with whom he grew to have a close relationship, "something like another brother." Gachet and his daughter were both subjects for Van Gogh's paintings.

For a time, Van Gogh seemed to improve. He began to paint at such a steady pace, there was barely space in his room for all the finished paintings. From May until his death on July 29, Van Gogh made about 70 paintings, more than one a day, and many drawings. Van Gogh painted buildings around the town of Auvers, such as The Church at Auvers, portraits, and the nearby fields.

"But for all his appearance of a renewed well-being," observes Wallace, "his life was very near its end." Illness struck Theo's baby, Vincent. Theo had both health and employment issues; he considered leaving his employer and starting his own business. Gachet, said to have his own eccentricities and neurosis, caused Van Gogh sufficient concern to question, "Now when one blind man leads another blind man, don't they both end up in the ditch?"

After visiting Paris for a family conference, Van Gogh returned to Auvers more bleak. In a letter he wrote, "And the prospect grows darker, I see no future at all."

== The painting ==
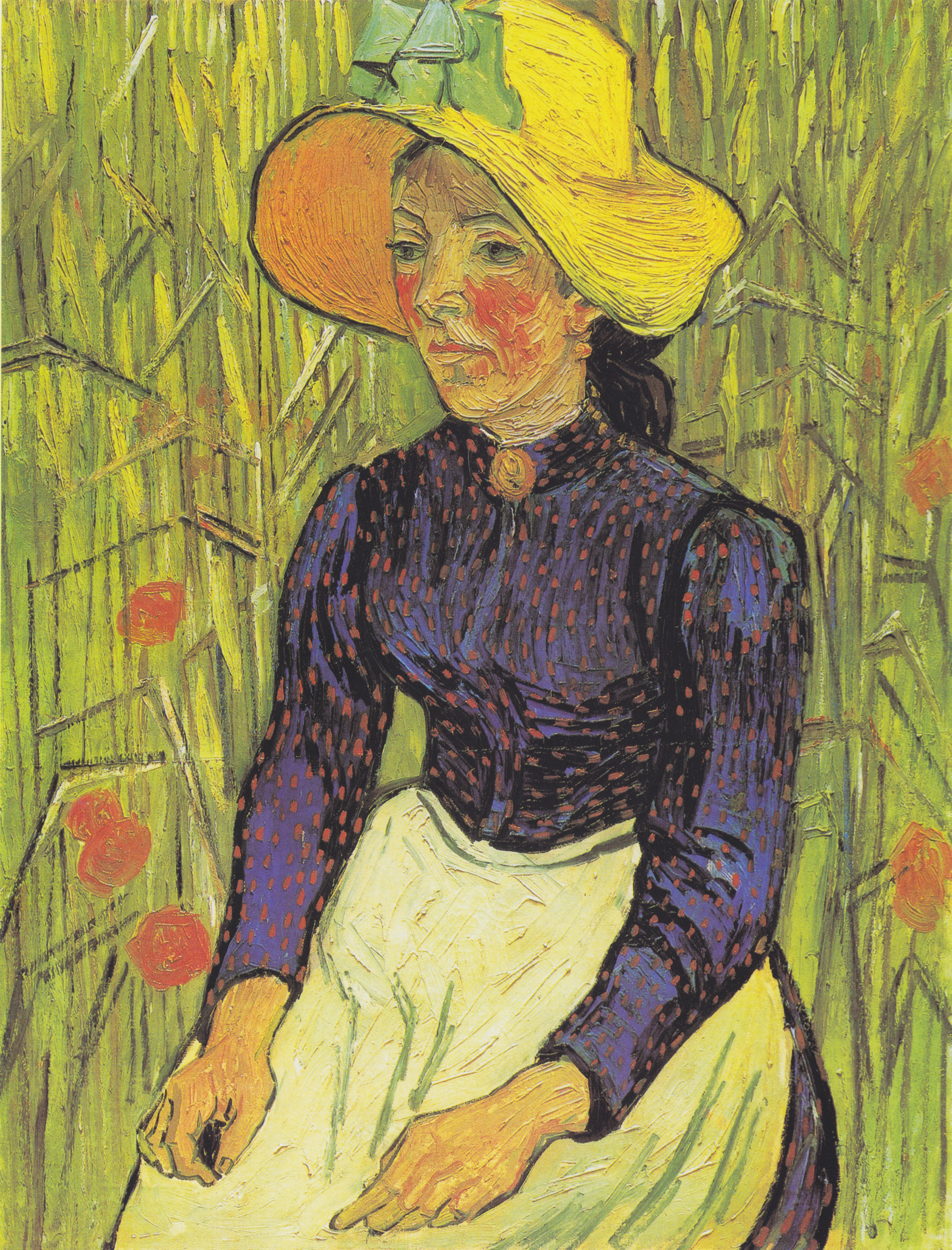
Vincent van Gogh, Young Peasant Woman with Straw Hat Sitting in the Wheat, June 1890

Of the paintings Van Gogh completed in Auvers, there were two of the same woman. He describes her as "a peasant woman, big yellow hat with a knot of sky-blue ribbons." The second painting may be Young Peasant Woman with Straw Hat Sitting in the Wheat.

Van Gogh uses the "picture plane" for dramatic effect. "How painters use the 'picture plane' is a telling measure," Harrison explains, "of the usually intended effects of their work and their disposition toward the spectator." Having the woman fill most of the pictorial space, she appears closer to the audience. Van Gogh further shadowed her face and gave her a "distant, unfocused" gaze. By also having the woman in close proximity, her emotional distance is "poignant".

== Comparison to literal likeness ==
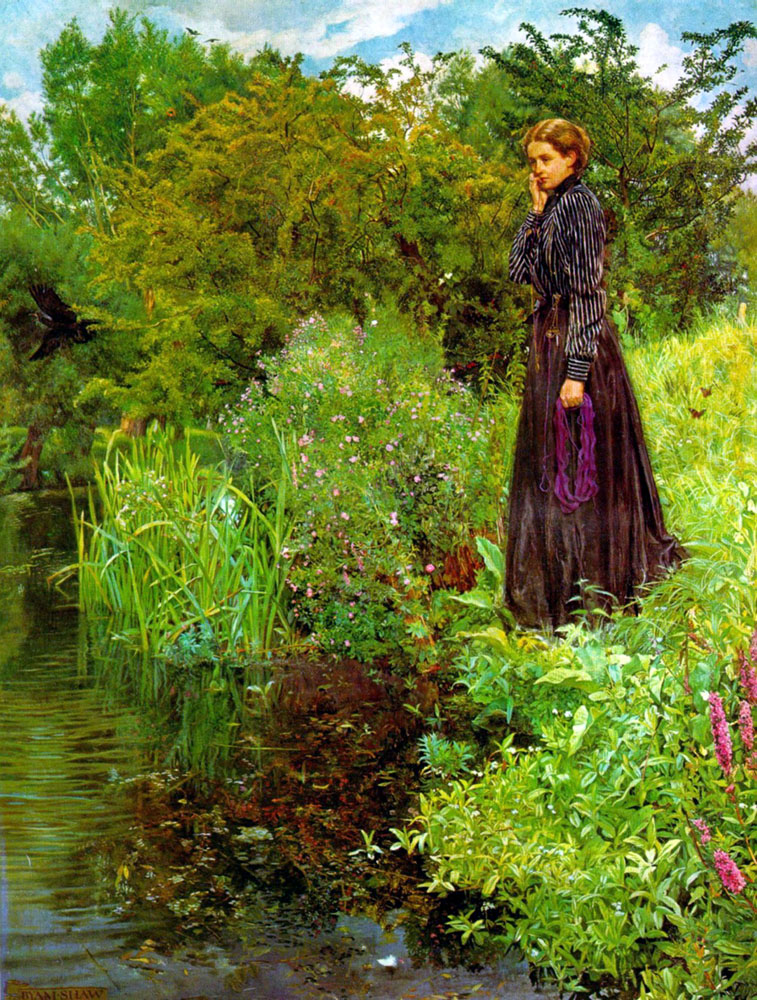
John Liston Byam Shaw, 1900 Boer War

In Primitivism, Cubism, Abstraction: The Early Twentieth Century, the authors compare Van Gogh's Girl in White to the portrait of a woman in John Byam Shaw's 1900 Boer War. They make the comparison by identifying desired characteristics of modernistic art, such as works "emphasizing formal aspects, and as embodying what they took to be a 'primitive' or 'direct' vision such as Vincent van Gogh's Girl in White. To modernists, this is desirable over the "exhibited skill and sophistication of literal likeness," such as John Byam Shaw's 1900 Boer War. The more primitive and direct works, they say, provide a richer feeling, whereas the literal interpretation represents a lack of "emotional content".

== Provenance ==
- Johanna van Gogh-Bonger (1862-1925), the artist's sister-in-law, of Amsterdam sold the painting in August 1908 to J.H. de Bois. Five of the paintings that were sold by Johanna became part of the National Gallery of Art collection.
- J.H. de Bois, an art dealer and director of The Hague branch of the C.M. Van Gogh gallery had the painting for a portion of 1908. C.M. van Gogh was Vincent's uncle.
- Richard Kisling (1862-1913) of Zürich, an avid collector with 4000 paintings, purchased the painting in 1908 from J.H. de Bois.
- Hedwig Glatt-Kisling of Zürich had the painting from 1908 to 1929.
- Max Bollag, a gallery owner, of Zürich then had the painting. He sold it in 1951 to Chester Dale.
- Chester Dale (1882-1962) of New York owned the painting from 1951 to 1963.
- In 1963 the painting was bequeathed to the National Gallery of Art and placed in the Chester Dale Collection. Chester Dale, as passionate and successful in his art collection as he was on Wall Street, bequeathed in 1962 to the National Gallery of Art some of the most important French painting from the late 19th and early 20th centuries in America.

== See also ==
- List of works by Vincent van Gogh
