= N. spectabilis =

N. spectabilis may refer to:

- Neoastelia spectabilis, a flowering plant species
- Neocrepidodera spectabilis, a beetle species
- Neoregelia spectabilis, a flowering plant species
- Nepenthes spectabilis, a pitcher plant species
