= Fuss (surname) =

Fuss (German for foot) is a surname. Notable people with the surname include:

- Adam Fuss (born 1961), British photographer
- Benjamin Fuss (born 1990), German footballer
- Karl Adolf Fuss (or Fuß) (1817–1874), Transylvanian pastor and entomologist
- Nicolas Fuss (1755–1826), Swiss mathematician
- Sonja Fuss (born 1978), German footballer
