= Fuß =

Fuß (German: foot) is a surname. Notable people with the surname include:

- Benjamin Fuß (born 1990), German footballer
- Fritz Fuß, Swiss sidecarcross racer
- Hans Fuß (1920−1942), German fighter pilot
- Michael Fuß (born 1977), German footballer
