= Neocrepidodera norica =

Scientific classification
- Kingdom: Animalia
- Phylum: Arthropoda
- Class: Insecta
- Order: Coleoptera
- Suborder: Polyphaga
- Infraorder: Cucujiformia
- Family: Chrysomelidae
- Subfamily: Galerucinae
- Tribe: Alticini
- Genus: Neocrepidodera
- Species: N. norica

Binomial name
- Neocrepidodera norica (Weise, 1890)

Synonyms
- Crepidodera norica Weise, 1890

Species of beetle

Neocrepidodera norica is a species of flea beetle from Chrysomelidae family that can be found in Austria, Bosnia and Herzegovina, Croatia, Italy, North Macedonia, Romania, and Slovenia.
