= Neocrepidodera ligurica =

Scientific classification
- Kingdom: Animalia
- Phylum: Arthropoda
- Class: Insecta
- Order: Coleoptera
- Suborder: Polyphaga
- Infraorder: Cucujiformia
- Family: Chrysomelidae
- Subfamily: Galerucinae
- Tribe: Alticini
- Genus: Neocrepidodera
- Species: N. ligurica

Binomial name
- Neocrepidodera ligurica (J. Daniel, 1904)

Synonyms
- Crepidodera ligurica J. Daniel, 1904

Species of beetle

Neocrepidodera ligurica is a species of flea beetle from Chrysomelidae family that can be found in France and Italy.
