= Neocrepidodera springeri =

Scientific classification
- Kingdom: Animalia
- Phylum: Arthropoda
- Class: Insecta
- Order: Coleoptera
- Suborder: Polyphaga
- Infraorder: Cucujiformia
- Family: Chrysomelidae
- Subfamily: Galerucinae
- Tribe: Alticini
- Genus: Neocrepidodera
- Species: N. springeri

Binomial name
- Neocrepidodera springeri (Heikertinger, 1923)

Synonyms
- Crepidodera springeri Heikertinger, 1923

Species of beetle

Neocrepidodera springeri is a species of flea beetle from Chrysomelidae family that can be found in Albania, Bosnia and Herzegovina, and Yugoslavia.
