= Neocrepidodera robusta =

Scientific classification
- Kingdom: Animalia
- Phylum: Arthropoda
- Clade: Pancrustacea
- Class: Insecta
- Order: Coleoptera
- Suborder: Polyphaga
- Infraorder: Cucujiformia
- Family: Chrysomelidae
- Tribe: Alticini
- Genus: Neocrepidodera
- Species: N. robusta

Binomial name
- Neocrepidodera robusta (J. L. LeConte, 1874)

Species of beetle

Neocrepidodera robusta is a species of flea beetle in the family Chrysomelidae. It is found in North America.
