= Neocrepidodera puncticollis =

Scientific classification
- Kingdom: Animalia
- Phylum: Arthropoda
- Class: Insecta
- Order: Coleoptera
- Suborder: Polyphaga
- Infraorder: Cucujiformia
- Family: Chrysomelidae
- Subfamily: Galerucinae
- Tribe: Alticini
- Genus: Neocrepidodera
- Species: N. puncticollis

Binomial name
- Neocrepidodera puncticollis (Reitter, 1879)

Synonyms
- Orestia puncticollis Reitter, 1879

Species of beetle

Neocrepidodera puncticollis is a species of flea beetle from Chrysomelidae family that can be found in Romania, Slovakia, and Ukraine.
