= Neocrepidodera simplicipes =

Scientific classification
- Kingdom: Animalia
- Phylum: Arthropoda
- Clade: Pancrustacea
- Class: Insecta
- Order: Coleoptera
- Suborder: Polyphaga
- Infraorder: Cucujiformia
- Family: Chrysomelidae
- Subfamily: Galerucinae
- Tribe: Alticini
- Genus: Neocrepidodera
- Species: N. simplicipes

Binomial name
- Neocrepidodera simplicipes (Kutschera, 1860)

Synonyms
- Crepidodera simplicipes (Kutschera, 1860)

Species of beetle

Neocrepidodera simplicipes is a species of flea beetle in the leaf beetle family that is endemic to Austria.
