= Neocrepidodera adelinae =

Scientific classification
- Kingdom: Animalia
- Phylum: Arthropoda
- Clade: Pancrustacea
- Class: Insecta
- Order: Coleoptera
- Suborder: Polyphaga
- Infraorder: Cucujiformia
- Family: Chrysomelidae
- Subfamily: Galerucinae
- Tribe: Alticini
- Genus: Neocrepidodera
- Species: N. adelinae

Binomial name
- Neocrepidodera adelinae (Binaghi, 1947)

Synonyms
- Crepidodera adelinae Binaghi, 1947

Species of beetle

Neocrepidodera adelinae is a species of flea beetle from a leaf beetle family that is endemic to Italy.
