= Neocrepidodera nigritula =

Scientific classification
- Kingdom: Animalia
- Phylum: Arthropoda
- Class: Insecta
- Order: Coleoptera
- Suborder: Polyphaga
- Infraorder: Cucujiformia
- Family: Chrysomelidae
- Subfamily: Galerucinae
- Tribe: Alticini
- Genus: Neocrepidodera
- Species: N. nigritula

Binomial name
- Neocrepidodera nigritula (Gyllenhal, 1813)

Synonyms
- Haltica nigritula Gyllenhal, 1813

Species of beetle

Neocrepidodera nigritula is a species of flea beetle from Chrysomelidae family that can be found everywhere in Europe except for Albania, Andorra, Benelux, Denmark, Liechtenstein, Moldova, Monaco, North Macedonia, Portugal, San Marino, Spain, Vatican City, Yugoslavia, and various European islands.
