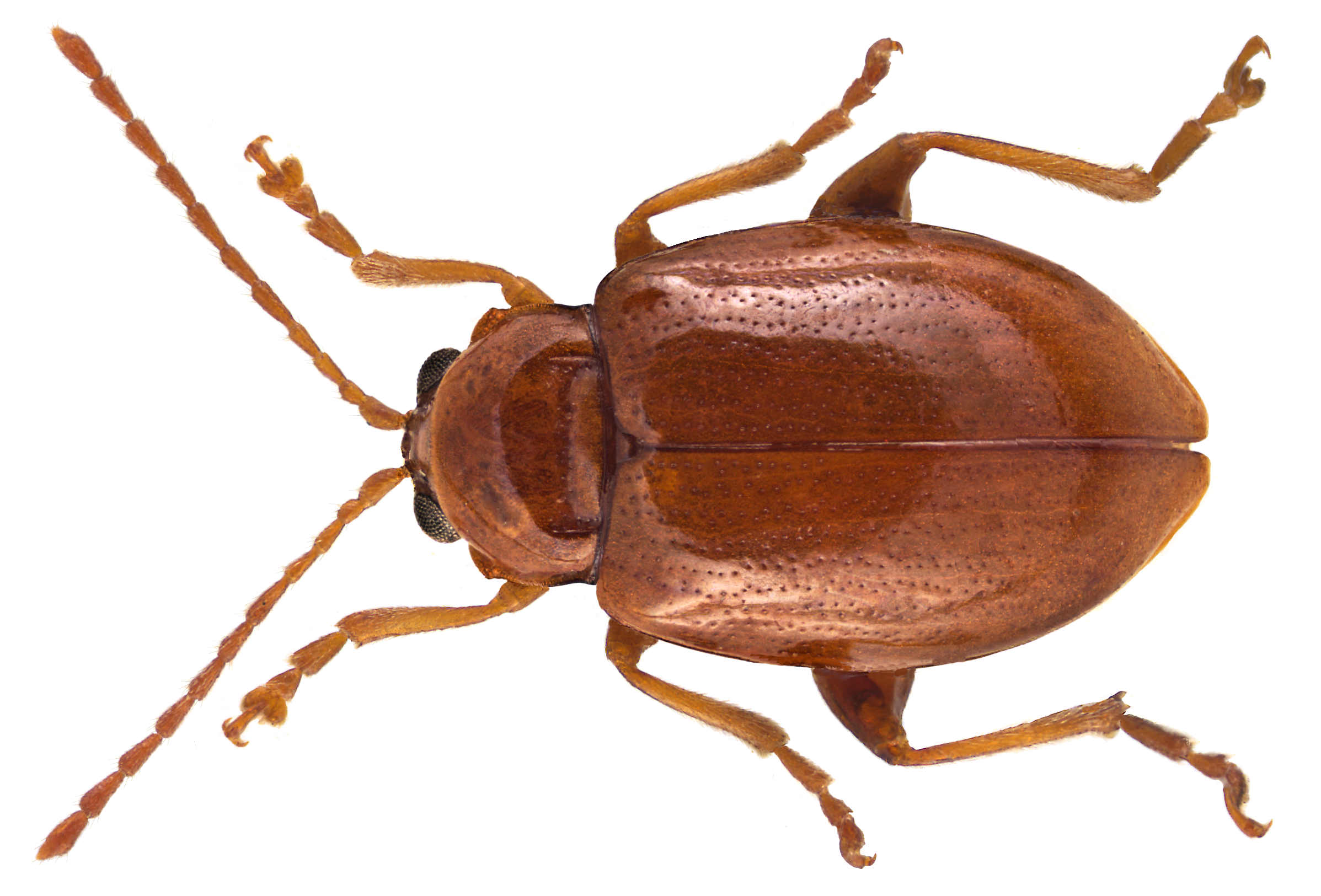

Scientific classification
- Kingdom: Animalia
- Phylum: Arthropoda
- Class: Insecta
- Order: Coleoptera
- Suborder: Polyphaga
- Infraorder: Cucujiformia
- Family: Chrysomelidae
- Subfamily: Galerucinae
- Tribe: Alticini
- Genus: Neocrepidodera
- Species: N. impressa

Binomial name
- Neocrepidodera impressa ( Fabricius, 1801)

Synonyms
- Galleruca impressa Fabricius, 1801

= Neocrepidodera impressa =

Species of beetle

Neocrepidodera impressa is a species of flea beetle from Chrysomelidae family that can be found everywhere in Europe except for Andorra, Austria, Baltic states, Czech Republic, Hungary, Liechtenstein, Moldova, Monaco, North Macedonia, Poland, Romania, San Marino, Vatican City, and eastern Europe.
