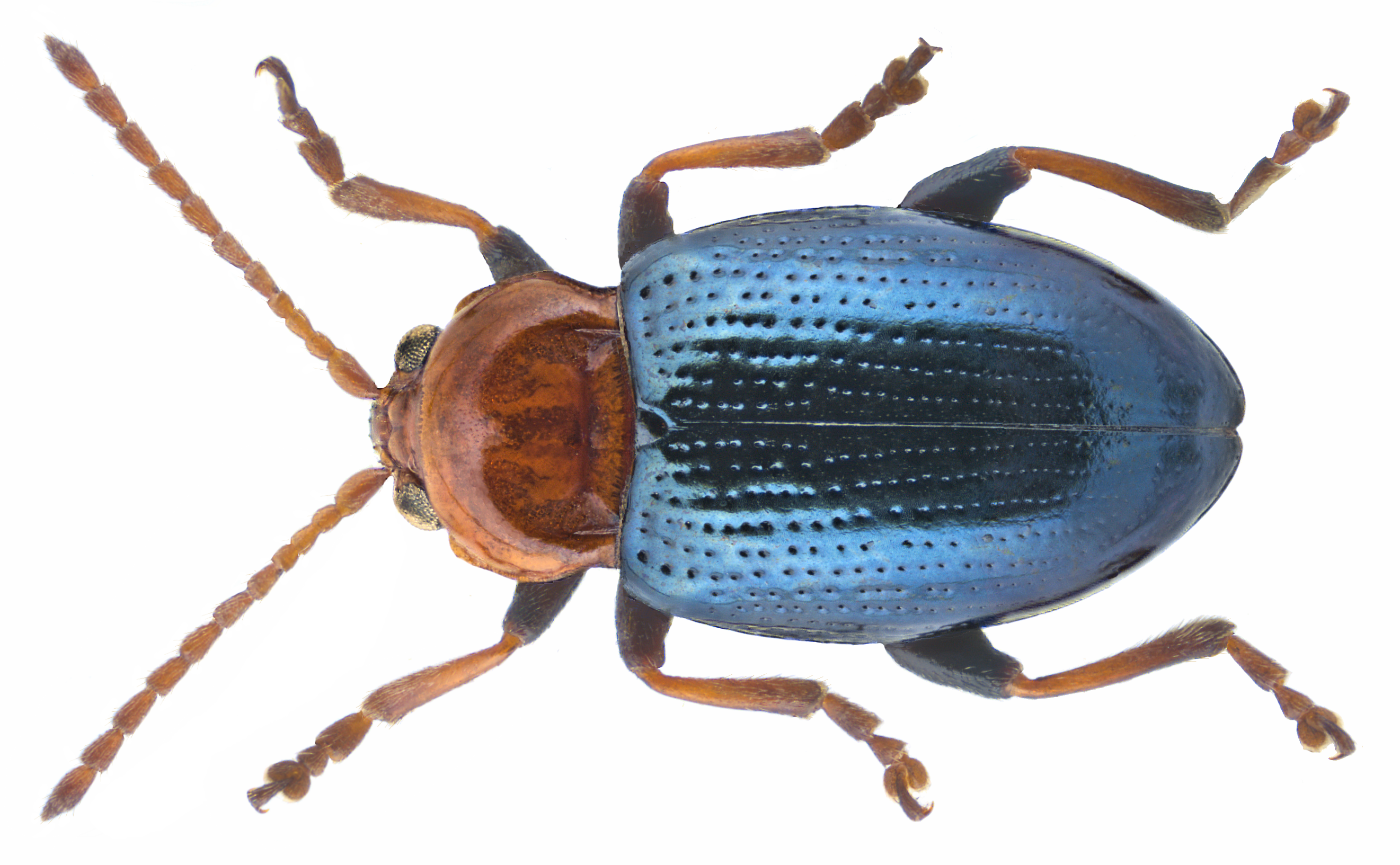

Scientific classification
- Kingdom: Animalia
- Phylum: Arthropoda
- Class: Insecta
- Order: Coleoptera
- Suborder: Polyphaga
- Infraorder: Cucujiformia
- Family: Chrysomelidae
- Subfamily: Galerucinae
- Tribe: Alticini
- Genus: Neocrepidodera
- Species: N. femorata

Binomial name
- Neocrepidodera femorata (Gyllenhal, 1813)

Synonyms
- Asiorestia femorata (Gyllenhal, 1813); Crepidodera femorata Gyllenhal, 1813

= Neocrepidodera femorata =

Species of beetle

Neocrepidodera femorata is a species of flea beetle from Chrysomelidae family that can be found everywhere in Europe except for Albania, Andorra, Croatia, Latvia, Liechtenstein, Moldova, Monaco, North Macedonia, San Marino, Vatican City, Yugoslavia, and various European islands.
