= Neocrepidodera cyanipennis =

Scientific classification
- Kingdom: Animalia
- Phylum: Arthropoda
- Class: Insecta
- Order: Coleoptera
- Suborder: Polyphaga
- Infraorder: Cucujiformia
- Family: Chrysomelidae
- Subfamily: Galerucinae
- Tribe: Alticini
- Genus: Neocrepidodera
- Species: N. cyanipennis

Binomial name
- Neocrepidodera cyanipennis ( Kutschera, 1860)

Synonyms
- Asiorestia cyanipennis

Species of beetle

Neocrepidodera cyanipennis is a species of flea beetle from Chrysomelidae family that can be found in Austria, France, Italy, Romania, Slovenia, and Switzerland.
