= Tadeusz Fuss-Kaden =

Polish artist (1914–1985)

Tadeusz Fuss-Kaden (15 September 1914 – 16 November 1985) was a Polish painter. He signed his paintings as Tadé or Fuss or Kaden. Fuss was his mother's name. After an acknowledgement of paternity by justice, his name was Kaden – that of his father. He was a painter of Polish origin who gained international attention in the 1960s for his powerful abstract compositions made of plaster and resin on board, with strips and rounds of rusted tin cans embedded on the surface. Later in the 60s, Tadé expanded his work by wooden sculptures looking like insects or Mars people. In addition, he started his typical design of Mediterranean houses.

Fuss-Kaden was born 15 September 1914 in Kraków, Poland, and was educated at Kraków University, the Institute of Plastic Arts, Warsaw, and the Academy of Fine Arts, Florence. After fleeing Poland in 1939, he lived in Switzerland, in Nice and in Paris. In Nice he won first prizes in 1951 and 1952 from the Mediterranean Union for Modern Art. In Paris he studied architecture and went on to design distinguished Mediterranean-Modern residences in Puerto de Andratx on Mallorca. He died 16 November 1985 and is buried in Andratx.

In 1941 together with other Polish painters he renovated a ceiling painting in a chapel in Zuchwil, Switzerland and in 1942 delivered a design for glass windows of a church in Canton of Solothurn. In 1947 there followed a mosaic work (Schwarzer Christus) in Bellach, Switzerland.

== One-person exhibitions ==
- 1943 Winterthur, Switzerland (Kunstgewerbesaal)
- 1947 Solothurn, Switzerland (Bookshop Lüthy)
- 1948 Bern, Switzerland (Lyceumsaal 1948)
- 1949 Solothurn, Switzerland (Bookshop Lüthy)
- 1950 Nice, France (Gallery Gui Blanchard)
- 1950 Paris, France (Galerie Bernheim-Jeune)
- 1951 Nice, France (L'Art Club)
- 1951 Zurich, Switzerland (Gallerie Kirchgasse)
- 1952 Menton, France (Premier Biennale a Menton)
- 1960 Paris, France (Gallery Edouard Loeb)
- 1961 London, England (Marlborough Gallery)
- 1962 New York, US (Bertha Schaefer Gallery)
- 1963 Paris, France (Gallery Edouard Loeb)
- 1964 Pittsburgh, US (Exposition Internationale de Pittsburgh, jury-selected for Institut Carnegie)
- 1965 Munich, Germany (Galerie Thomas)
- 1966 New York, US (Bertha Schaefer Gallery)
- 1965 Stockholm, Sweden (Svea Galleriet)

== Group exhibitions ==
- 1950 Nice France (U.M.A.M - Union Mediterranéenne pour l'art moderne - with a 2nd prize),
- 1951 Nice, France ("Prix de la jeune peinture" 1st prize U.M.A.M Prix Galerie Massena),
- 1952 Vallauris, France ("Peinture et Lumieres" together with Picasso, Chagall, Matisse, Pignon, Poliakoff, Leger and others)
- 1952 Nice, France ("Prix de la jeune Peinture" 1st prize U.M.A.M Galerie Massena and 1st prize Pébéo)
- 1952 Cagnes-sur-Mer, France ("Premier Salon d'Art Mediterraneen" together with Renoir, Chagall, Picasso, Matisse, Winter and others)

Notable buyers of his paintings included playwright Samuel Beckett, pianist Artur Rubinstein, art historian Will Grohmann and entrepreneurs Burton Tremaine and John Delorean as well as collections in New York United States Galerie BING and Weintraub and Richard Sussman and La Rochefoucauld Duc D´Estrées.

Known purchases from art museums are Museum d'Art Moderne, Paris 1962, 1963 and University of Massachusetts, Amherst 1962.

== Sources ==
- J. Reichardt, "Apollo" 74:152 (May, 1961).
- "Art News" (Summer 1962).
- "Art News" 65:64 (March, 1966).
- "Arts" 40:70 (April, 1966).
- Gustave von Groschwitz, catalogue for "1964 Pittsburgh Exhibition of Contemporary Painting and Sculpture," Museum of Art, Carnegie Institute, October 30, 1964 – January 10, 1965.
- Sun Axelsson, catalogue for Tadé exhibition, Galerie Thomas, Munich, October 23-November 14, 1965.
- Memo from Tadé in the ownership of his niece in Pto. Andtratx
