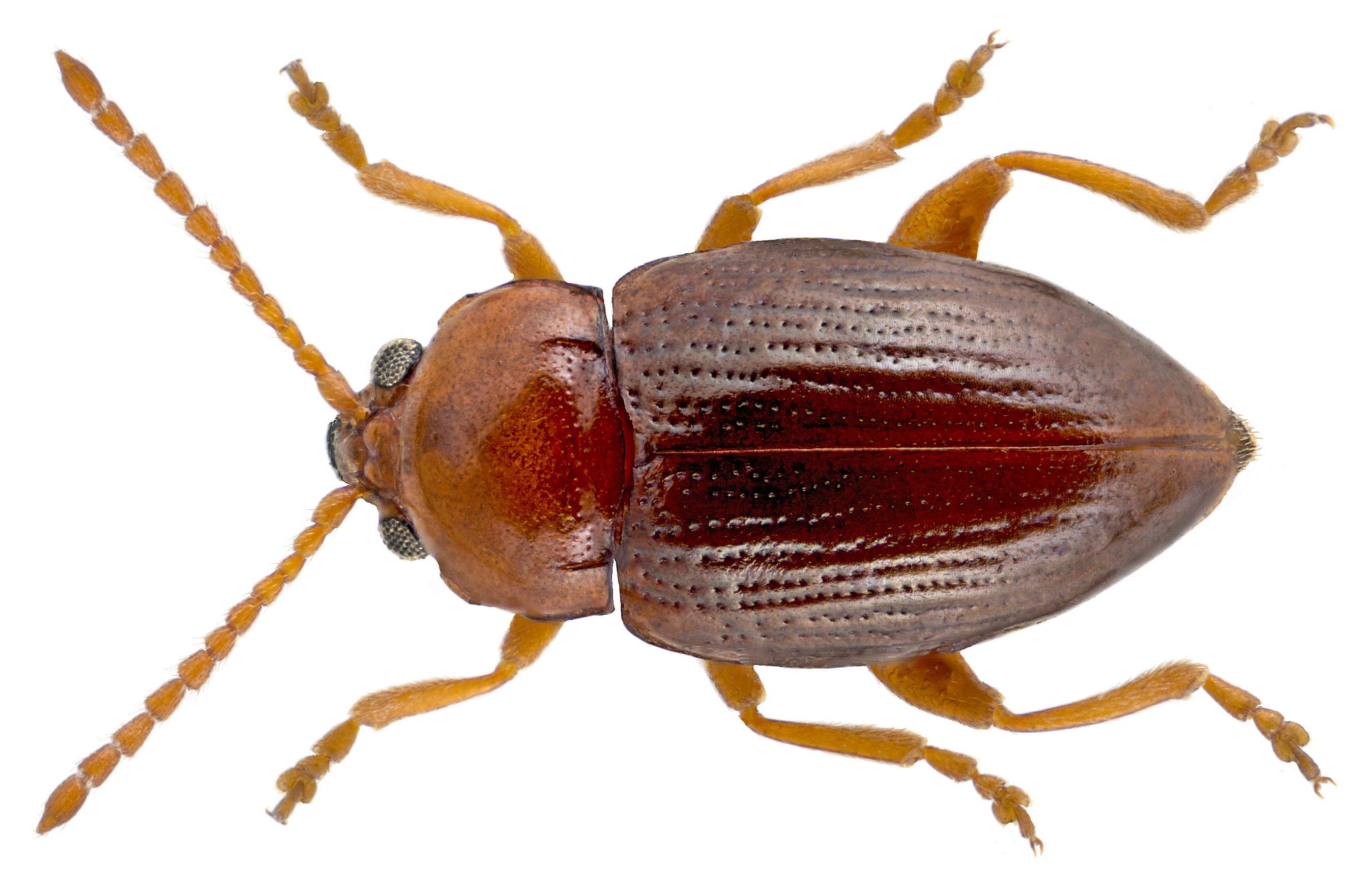

Scientific classification
- Kingdom: Animalia
- Phylum: Arthropoda
- Class: Insecta
- Order: Coleoptera
- Suborder: Polyphaga
- Infraorder: Cucujiformia
- Family: Chrysomelidae
- Subfamily: Galerucinae
- Tribe: Alticini
- Genus: Neocrepidodera
- Species: N. obirensis

Binomial name
- Neocrepidodera obirensis ( Ganglbauer, 1897)

Synonyms
- Crepidodera obirensis Ganglbauer, 1897

= Neocrepidodera obirensis =

Species of beetle

Neocrepidodera obirensis is a species of flea beetle from Chrysomelidae family that can be found in Austria and Slovenia.
