= Neocrepidodera motschulskii =

Scientific classification
- Kingdom: Animalia
- Phylum: Arthropoda
- Class: Insecta
- Order: Coleoptera
- Suborder: Polyphaga
- Infraorder: Cucujiformia
- Family: Chrysomelidae
- Subfamily: Galerucinae
- Tribe: Alticini
- Genus: Neocrepidodera
- Species: N. motschulskii

Binomial name
- Neocrepidodera motschulskii (Konstantinov, 1991)

Synonyms
- Asiorestia motschulskii (Konstantinov, 1991)

Species of beetle

Neocrepidodera motschulskii is a species of flea beetle from Chrysomelidae family that can be found everywhere in Europe except for Albania, Andorra, Latvia, Liechtenstein, Moldova, Monaco, Romania, San Marino, Spain, Switzerland, Vatican City, Yugoslavian states, and various European islands.
