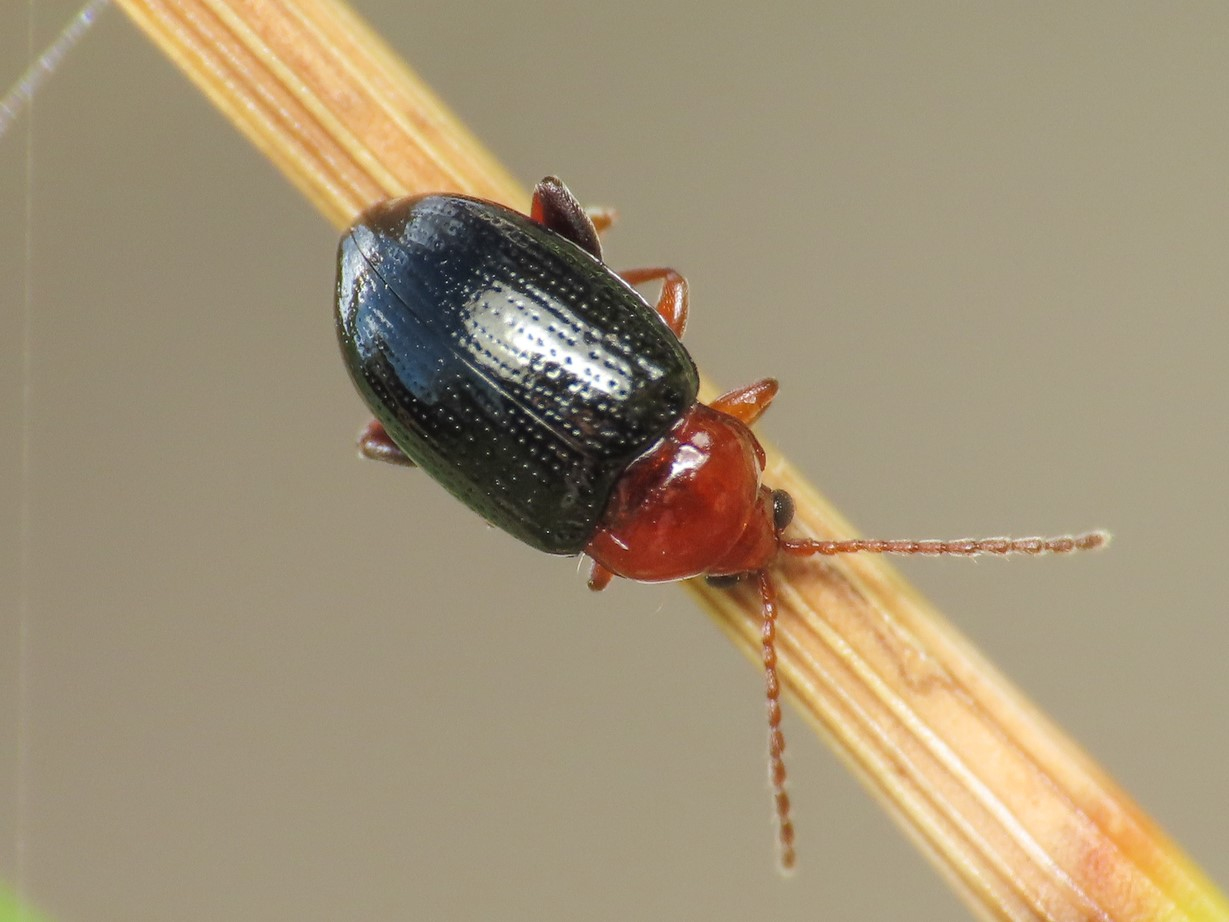
- In Italy

Scientific classification
- Kingdom: Animalia
- Phylum: Arthropoda
- Class: Insecta
- Order: Coleoptera
- Suborder: Polyphaga
- Infraorder: Cucujiformia
- Family: Chrysomelidae
- Genus: Neocrepidodera
- Species: N. corpulenta

Binomial name
- Neocrepidodera corpulenta (Kutschera, 1860)

Synonyms
- Asiorestia corpulenta (Kutschera, 1860); Crepidodera corpulenta Kutschera, 1860

= Neocrepidodera corpulenta =

Species of beetle

Neocrepidodera corpulenta is a species of flea beetle from the Chrysomelidae family that can be found in Albania, Bulgaria, France, Italy, Romania, and in all states of former Yugoslavia.
