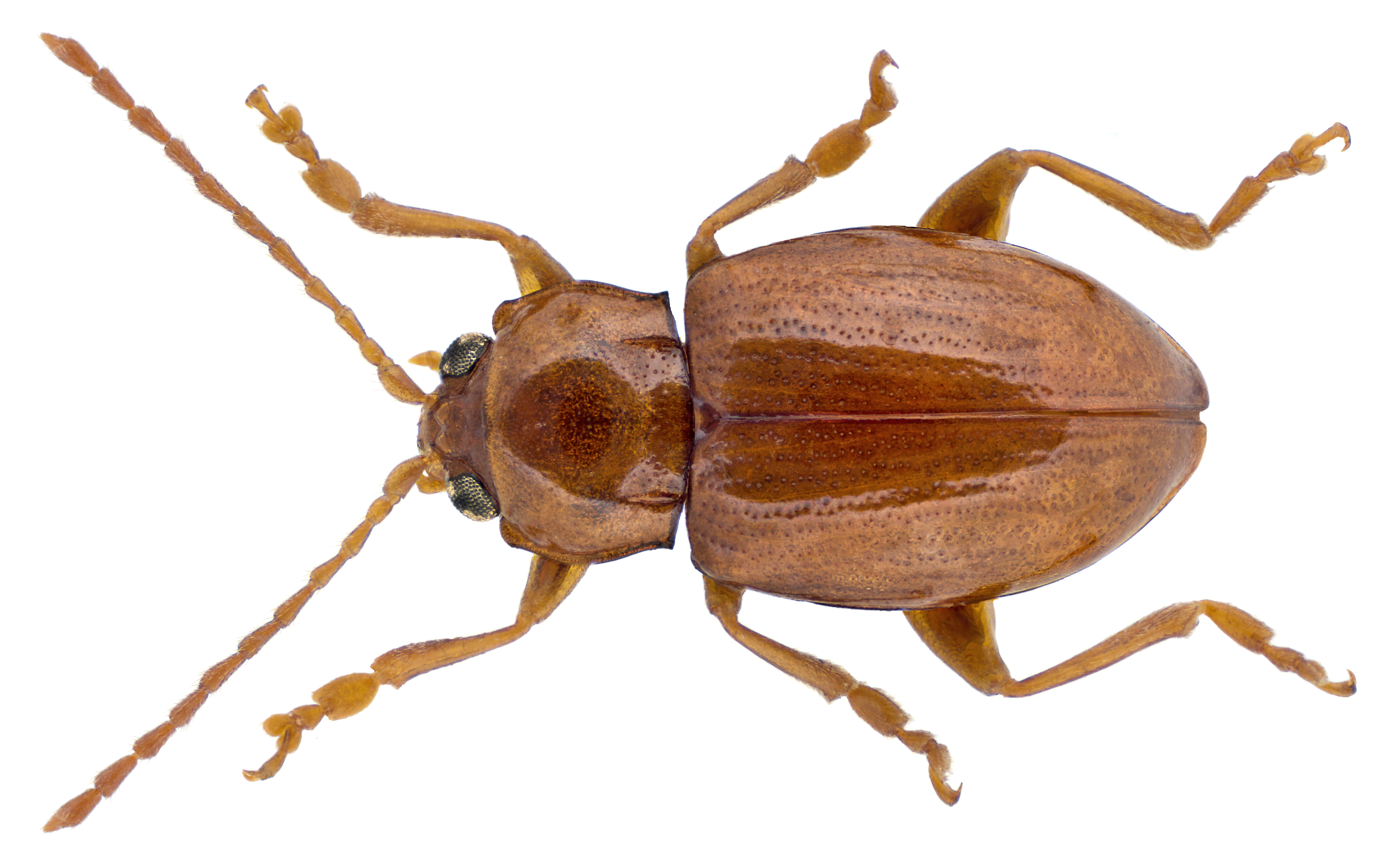

Scientific classification
- Kingdom: Animalia
- Phylum: Arthropoda
- Clade: Pancrustacea
- Class: Insecta
- Order: Coleoptera
- Suborder: Polyphaga
- Infraorder: Cucujiformia
- Family: Chrysomelidae
- Subfamily: Galerucinae
- Tribe: Alticini
- Genus: Neocrepidodera
- Species: N. brevicollis

Binomial name
- Neocrepidodera brevicollis (J. Daniel, 1904)

Synonyms
- Crepidodera brevicollis J. Daniel, 1904

= Neocrepidodera brevicollis =

Species of beetle

Neocrepidodera brevicollis is a species of flea beetle from a leaf beetle family that can be found in Austria, Czech Republic, Denmark, France, Germany, Italy, Poland, Slovakia, Sweden, and Switzerland.
