= Neocrepidodera cyanescens =

Scientific classification
- Kingdom: Animalia
- Phylum: Arthropoda
- Class: Insecta
- Order: Coleoptera
- Suborder: Polyphaga
- Infraorder: Cucujiformia
- Family: Chrysomelidae
- Genus: Neocrepidodera
- Species: N. cyanescens

Binomial name
- Neocrepidodera cyanescens (Duftschmid, 1825)

Synonyms
- Asiorestia cyanescens (Duftschmid, 1825); Haltica cyanescens Duftschmid, 1825

Species of beetle

Neocrepidodera cyanescens is a species of black coloured flea beetle from Chrysomelidae family that can be found in Austria, Czech Republic, France, Italy, Poland, Romania, Slovakia, Slovenia, Switzerland, and Ukraine.
