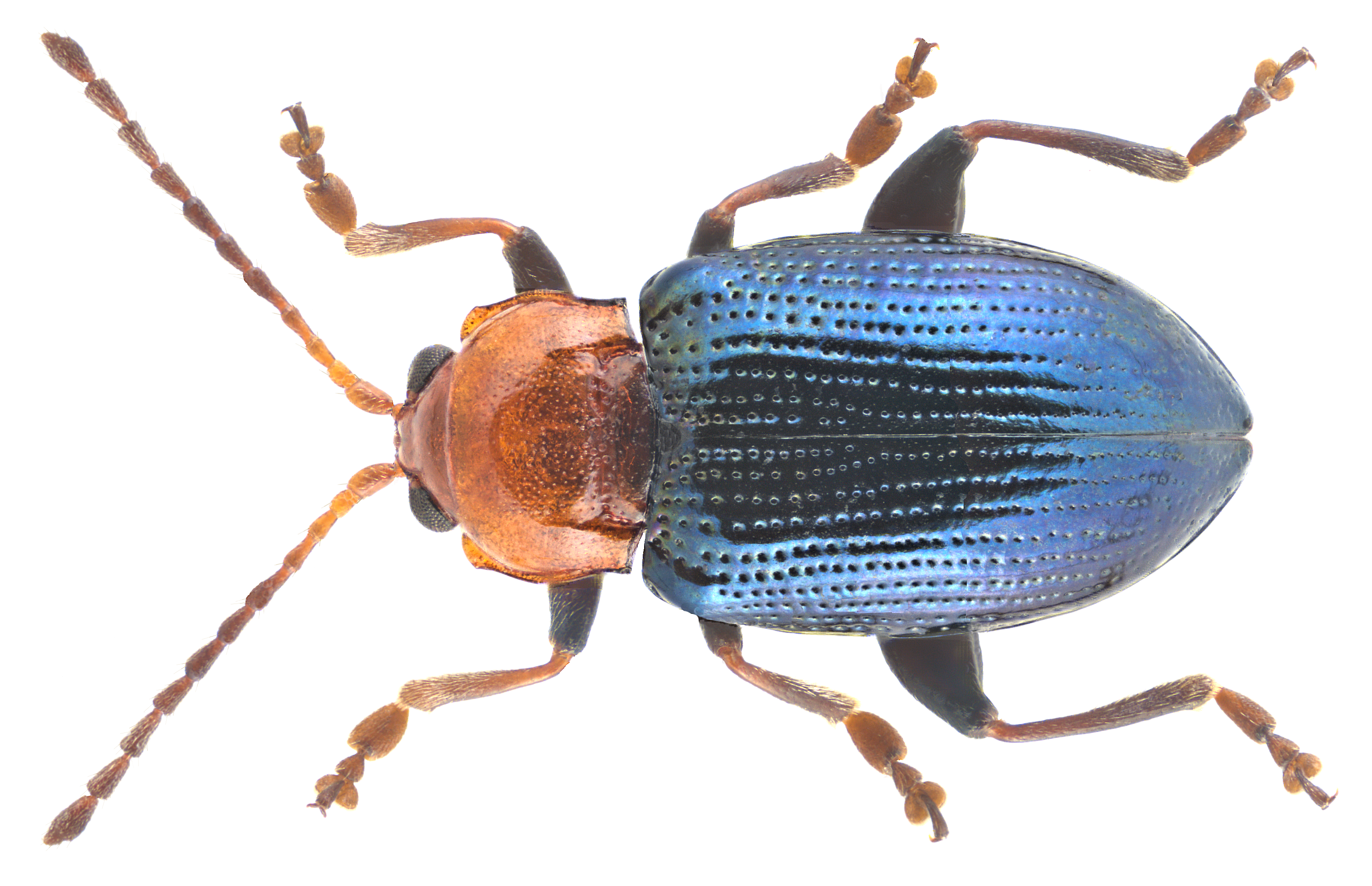

Scientific classification
- Kingdom: Animalia
- Phylum: Arthropoda
- Class: Insecta
- Order: Coleoptera
- Suborder: Polyphaga
- Infraorder: Cucujiformia
- Family: Chrysomelidae
- Subfamily: Galerucinae
- Tribe: Alticini
- Genus: Neocrepidodera
- Species: N. peirolerii

Binomial name
- Neocrepidodera peirolerii ( Kutschera, 1860)

Synonyms
- Crepidodera peirolerii Kutschera, 1860

= Neocrepidodera peirolerii =

Species of beetle

Neocrepidodera peirolerii is a species of flea beetle from Chrysomelidae family that can be found in Austria, Bosnia and Herzegovina, France, Germany, Italy, Liechtenstein, North Macedonia, Slovenia, and Switzerland.
