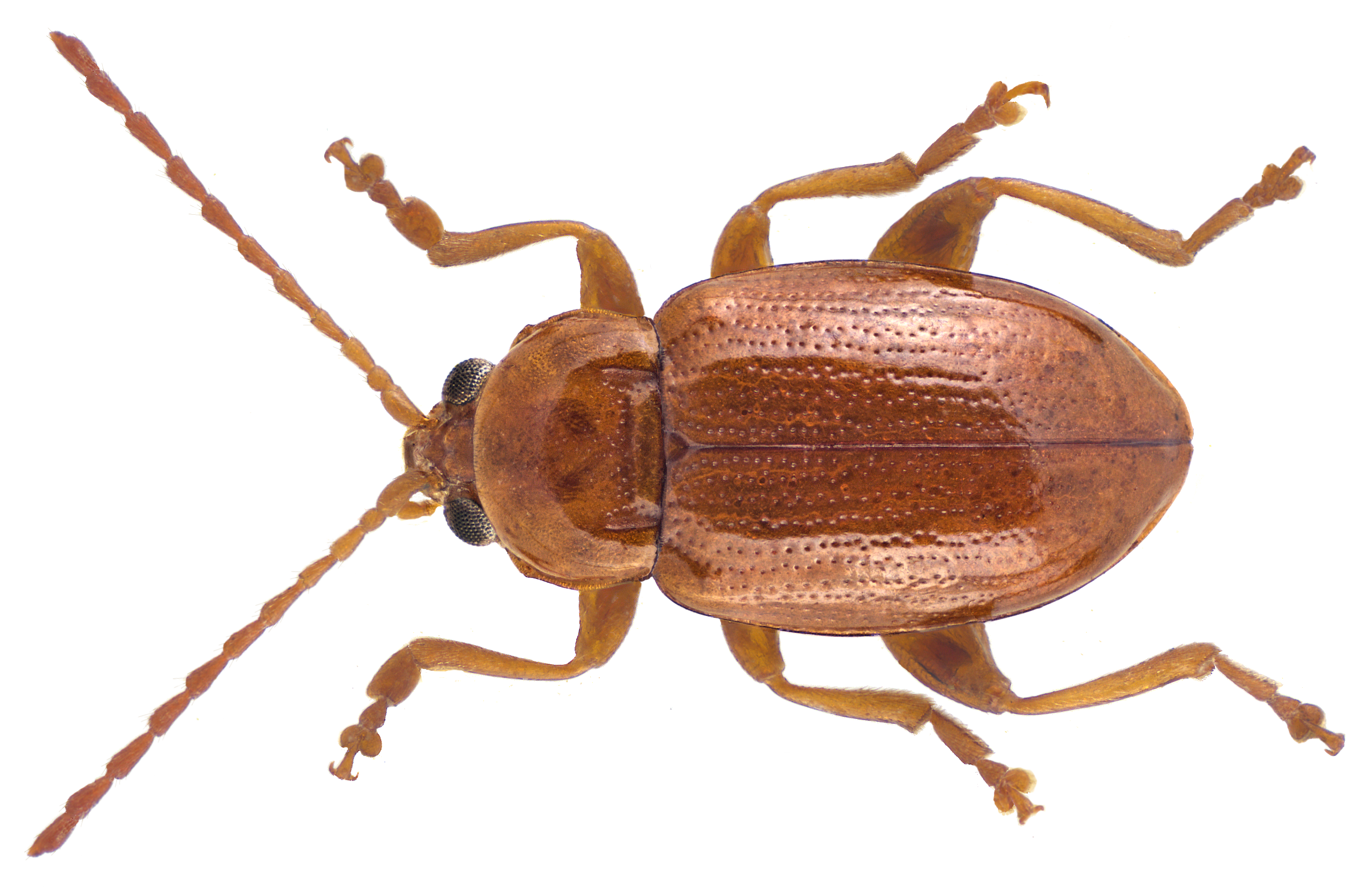
- Neocrepidodera transversa 4,3 mm (4,0 to 5,0 mm)

Scientific classification
- Kingdom: Animalia
- Phylum: Arthropoda
- Clade: Pancrustacea
- Class: Insecta
- Order: Coleoptera
- Suborder: Polyphaga
- Infraorder: Cucujiformia
- Family: Chrysomelidae
- Subfamily: Galerucinae
- Tribe: Alticini
- Genus: Neocrepidodera
- Species: N. transversa

Binomial name
- Neocrepidodera transversa (Marsham, 1802)

Synonyms
- Crepidodera transversa (Marsham, 1802)

= Neocrepidodera transversa =

Species of beetle

Neocrepidodera transversa is a species of flea beetle from Chrysomelidae family that can be found everywhere in Europe except for Andorra, Finland, Greece, Latvia, Monaco, Norway, San Marino, Vatican City, and various European islands.
