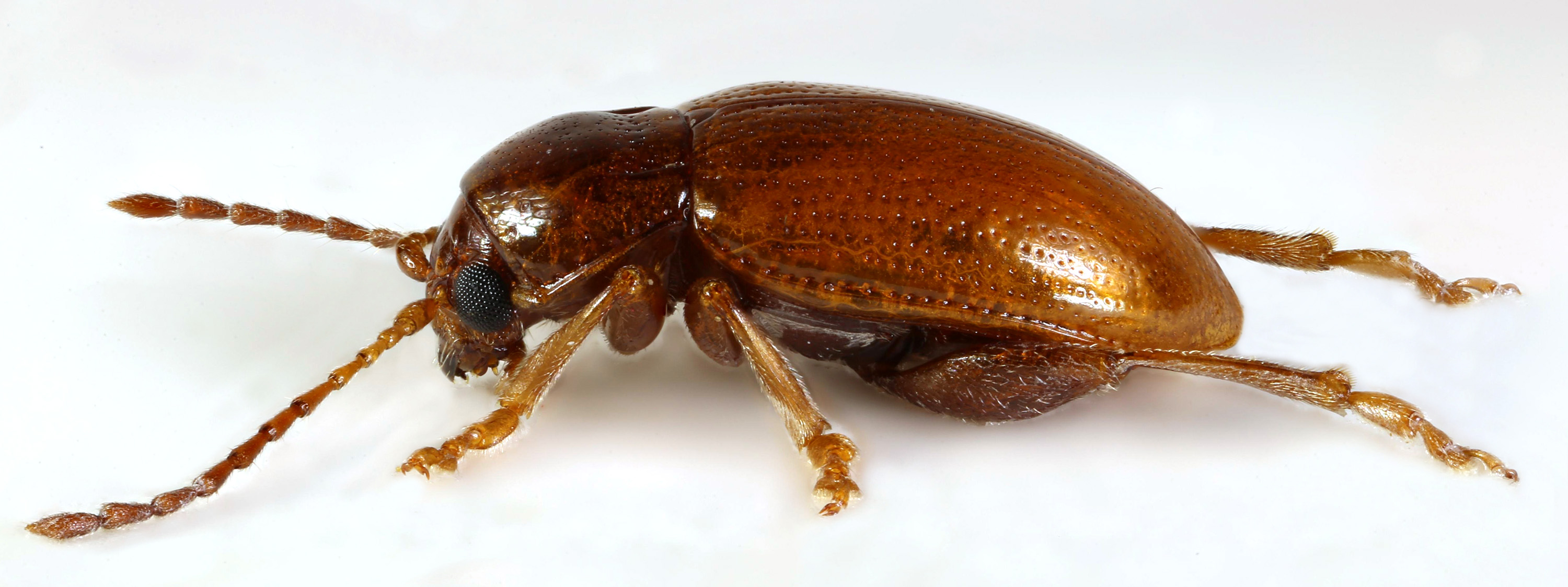
- N. ferruginea
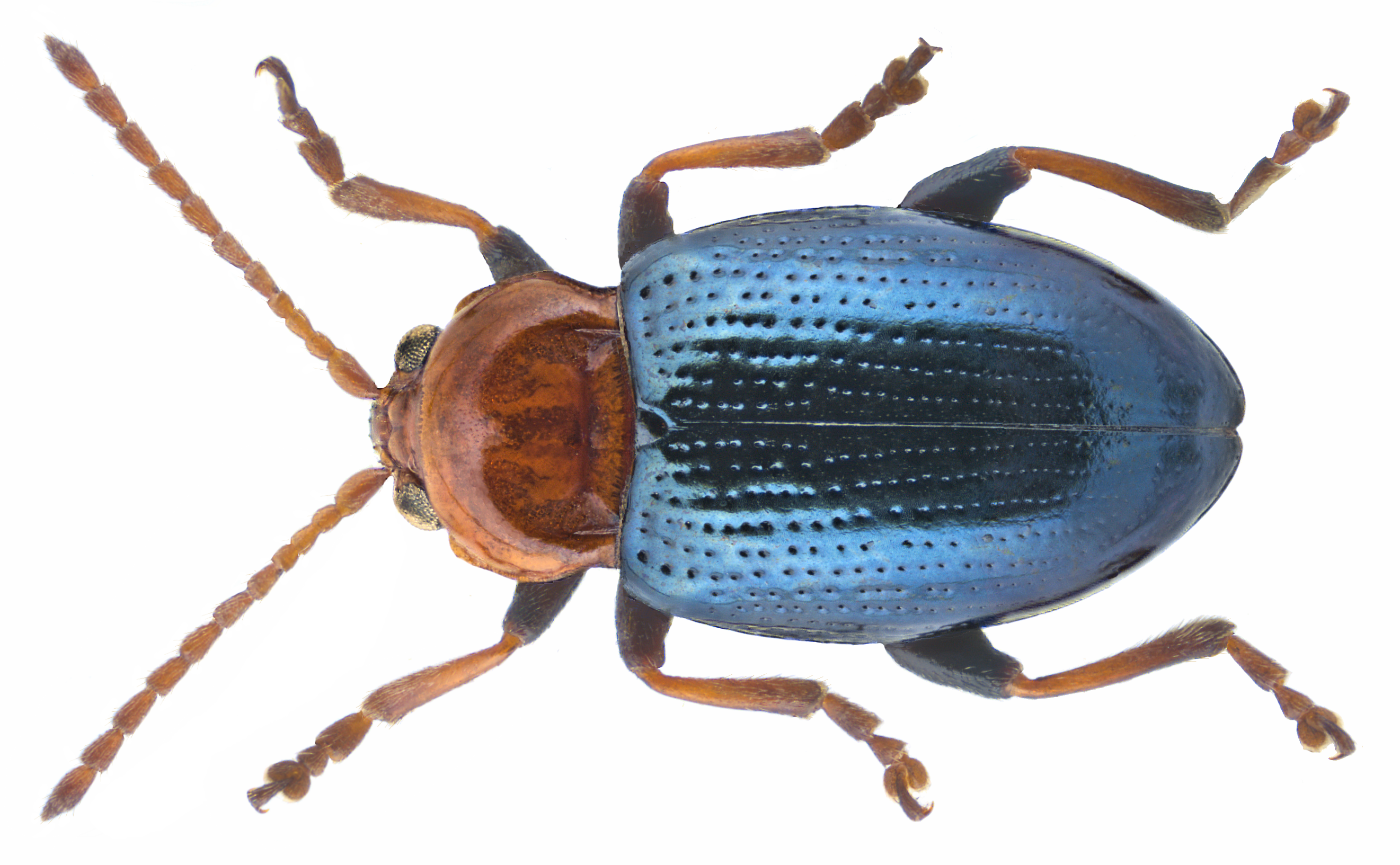
- N. femorata

Scientific classification
- Kingdom: Animalia
- Phylum: Arthropoda
- Class: Insecta
- Order: Coleoptera
- Suborder: Polyphaga
- Infraorder: Cucujiformia
- Family: Chrysomelidae
- Subfamily: Galerucinae
- Tribe: Alticini
- Genus: Neocrepidodera; Heikertinger, 1911

Type species
- Ochrosis sibirica Pic, 1909

Synonyms
- Asiorestia Jacobson, 1926; Orestioides Hatch, 1935

= Neocrepidodera =

Genus of beetles

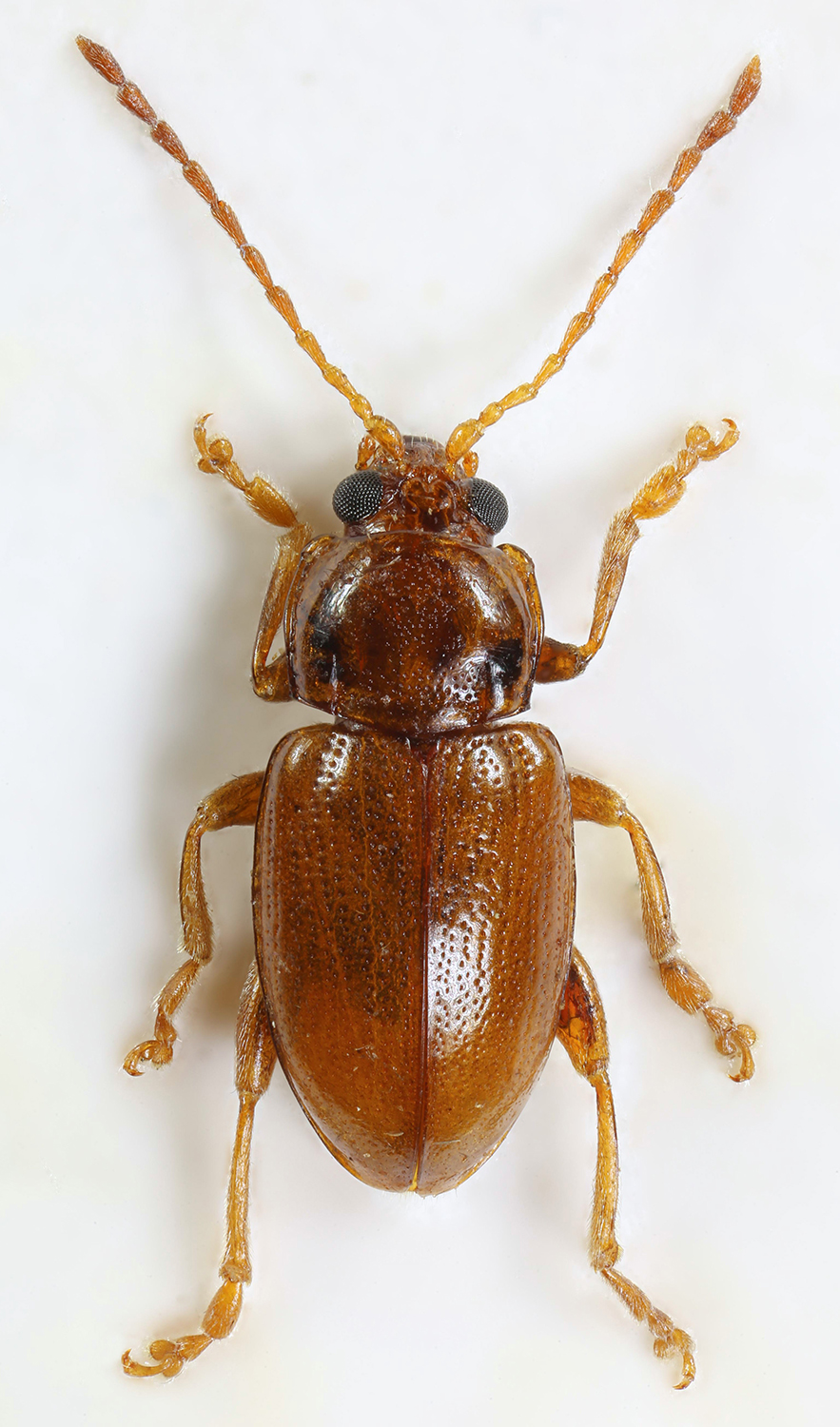
Neocrepidodera transversa

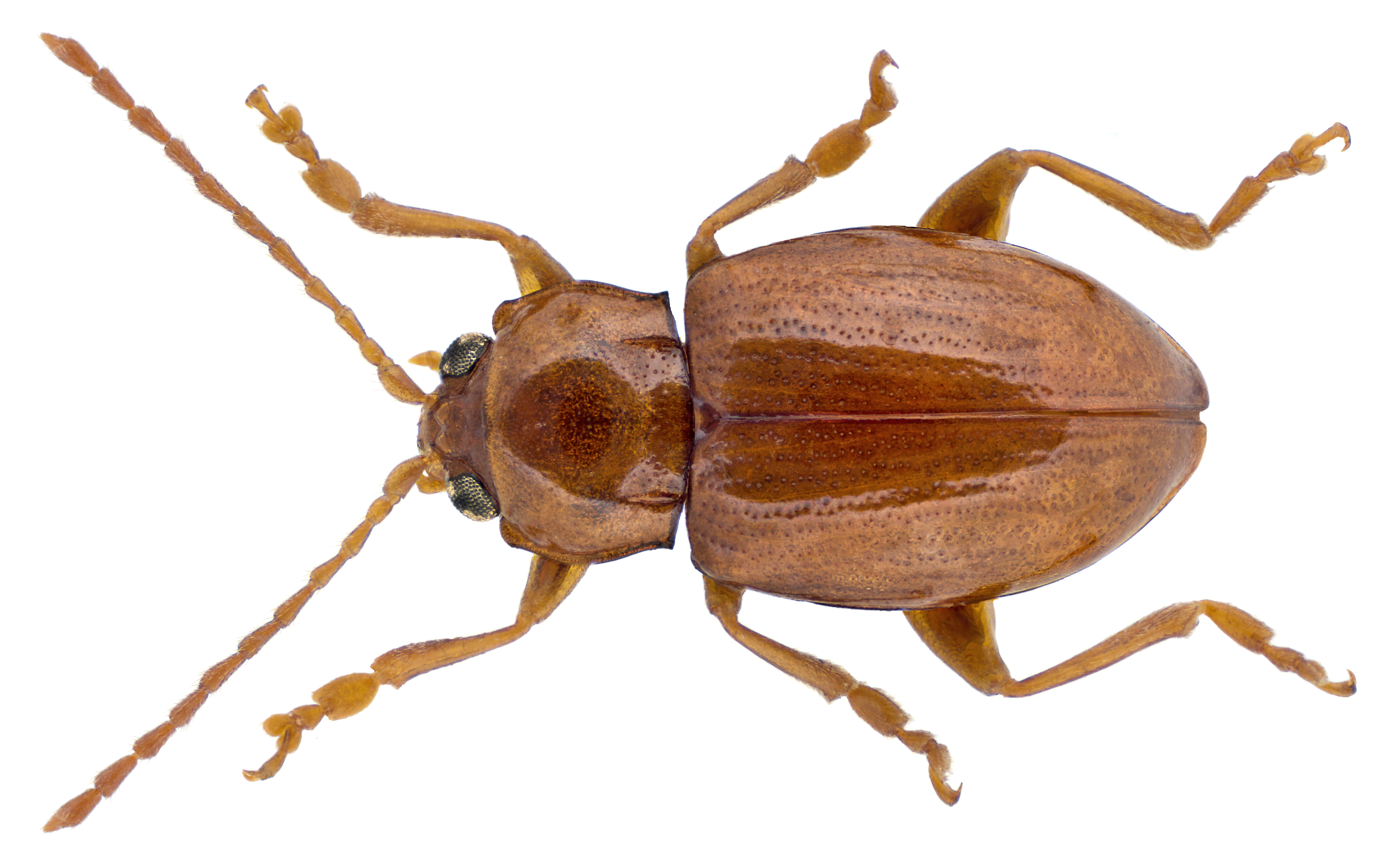
Neocrepidodera brevicollis

Neocrepidodera is a genus of flea beetles in the family Chrysomelidae, containing some 100 described species worldwide.

== Selected species ==
- N. acuminata (Jacoby, 1885)
- N. adelinae (Binaghi, 1947)
- N. albanica (Mohr, 1965)
- N. arunachalensis (Basu, 1991)
- N. basalis (K. Daniel, 1900)
- N. bolognai (Biondi, 1982)
- N. brevicollis (J. Daniel, 1904)
- N. carolinae Baselga & Novoa, 2005
- N. cheni (Gressitt & Kimoto, 1963)
- N. chinensis Gruev, 1981
- N. convexa (Gressitt & Kimoto, 1963)
- N. corpulenta (Kutschera, 1860)
- N. crassicornis (Faldermann, 1837)
- N. cyanescens (Duftschmid, 1825)
- N. cyanipennis (Kutschera, 1860)
- N. danahina (Basu, 1991)
- N. femorata (Gyllenhal, 1813)
- N. ferruginea (Scopoli, 1763)
- N. fulva Kimoto, 1991
- N. gruevi (Kimoto, 1983)
- N. himalayana (L. N. Medvedev & Sprecher-Uebersax, 1997)
- N. hispanica (J. Daniei, 1904)
- N. hummeli (S.-H. Chen, 1934)
- N. impressa (Fabricius, 1801)
- N. interpunctata (Motschulsky, 1859)
- N. irrorata (L. N. Medvedev, 1997)
- N. komatsui (Nakane, 1963)
- N. konstantinovi Baselga, 2006
- N. kozhantshikovi (Jakobson, 1926)
- N. laevicollis (Jacoby, 1885)
- N. ligurica (J. Daniel, 1904)
- N. manobioides (S.-H. Chen, 1939)
- N. melanopus (Kutschera, 1860)
- N. melanostoma (L. Redtenbacher, 1849)
- N. minima (Gressitt & Kimoto, 1963)
- N. motschulskii (Konstantinov, 1991)
- N. naini (Scherer, 1969)
- N. nepalica (L. N. Medvedev, 1990)
- N. nigritula (Gyllenhal, 1813)
- N. nobilis (J. Daniel, 1904)
- N. norica (Weise, 1890)
- N. obirensis (Ganglbauer, 1897)
- N. obscuritarsis (Motschulsky, 1859)
- N. oculata (Gressitt & Kimoto, 1963)
- N. ohkawai Takizawa, 2002
- N. pallida (Fall, 1910)
- N. peirolerii (Kutschera, 1860)
- N. peregrina (Harold, 1875)
- N. precaria Baselga & Novoa, 2005
- N. puncticollis (Reitter, 1879)
- N. recticollis (Jacoby, 1885)
- N. resina (Gressitt & Kimoto, 1963)
- N. rhaetica (Kutsehera, 1860)
- N. robusta (J. L. LeConte, 1874)
- N. satoi Takizawa, 2002
- N. schenklingi Csiki, 1939
- N. sibirica (Pic, 1909)
- N. simplicipes (Kutsehera, 1860)
- N. spectabilis (J. Daniel, 1904)
- N. springeri (Heikertinger, 1923)
- N. sublaevis (Motschulsky, 1859)
- N. taiwana (Kimoto, 1996)
- N. takara Nakane, 1963
- N. thoracica (L. N. Medvedev, 1990)
- N. transsilvanica (Fuss, 1864)
- N. transversa (Marsharn, 1802)
- N. wittmeri (L. N. Medvedev, 1997)
