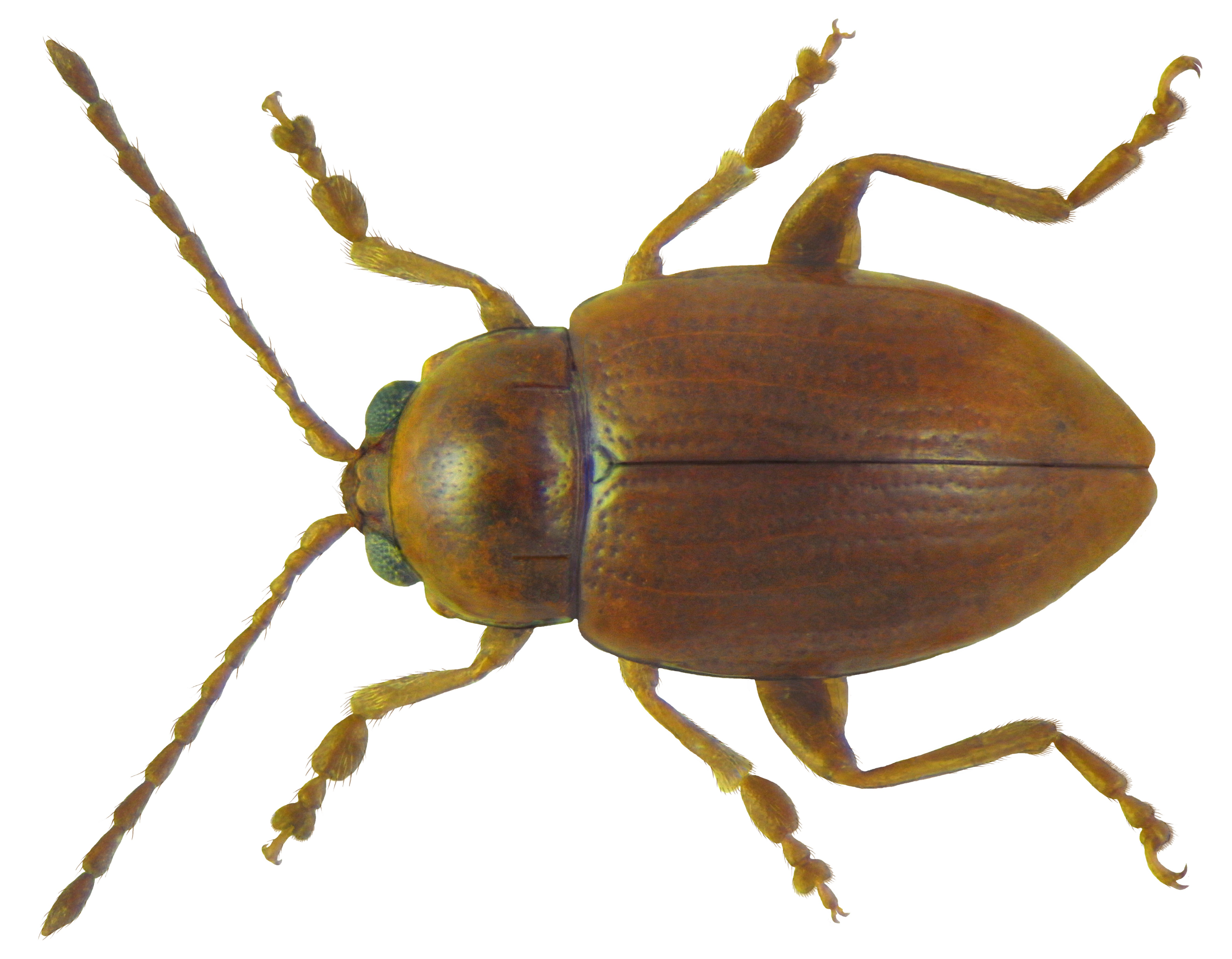
- Neocrepidodera ferruginea 2,9 mm (2,4-4 mm)

Scientific classification
- Domain: Eukaryota
- Kingdom: Animalia
- Phylum: Arthropoda
- Class: Insecta
- Order: Coleoptera
- Suborder: Polyphaga
- Infraorder: Cucujiformia
- Family: Chrysomelidae
- Subfamily: Galerucinae
- Tribe: Alticini
- Genus: Neocrepidodera
- Species: N. ferruginea

Binomial name
- Neocrepidodera ferruginea ( Scopoli, 1763)

Synonyms
- Chrysomela ferruginea Scopoli, 1763

= Neocrepidodera ferruginea =

Species of beetle

Neocrepidodera ferruginea is a species of beetle from the family Chrysomelidae. It is found in all of Europe.

== Description and habitat ==
The species are brown coloured. The species lives in meadows, and has numerous predators, such as larvae of Ichneumonidae, Braconidae and sometimes Pentatomidae species. The species feeds on different kinds of Poaceae and Asteraceae and have also been recorded on Cirsium, Trifolium, Urtica dioica and Vicia.
