= Neocrepidodera melanopus =

Scientific classification
- Kingdom: Animalia
- Phylum: Arthropoda
- Class: Insecta
- Order: Coleoptera
- Suborder: Polyphaga
- Infraorder: Cucujiformia
- Family: Chrysomelidae
- Subfamily: Galerucinae
- Tribe: Alticini
- Genus: Neocrepidodera
- Species: N. melanopus

Binomial name
- Neocrepidodera melanopus ( Kutschera, 1860)

Synonyms
- Crepidodera melanopus (Kutschera, 1860)

Species of beetle

Neocrepidodera melanopus is a species of flea beetle from Chrysomelidae family that can be found in Andorra, France, and Spain.
