= Neocrepidodera albanica =

Scientific classification
- Kingdom: Animalia
- Phylum: Arthropoda
- Class: Insecta
- Order: Coleoptera
- Suborder: Polyphaga
- Infraorder: Cucujiformia
- Family: Chrysomelidae
- Subfamily: Galerucinae
- Tribe: Alticini
- Genus: Neocrepidodera
- Species: N. albanica

Binomial name
- Neocrepidodera albanica (Mohr, 1965)

Synonyms
- Crepidodera albanica Mohr, 1965

Species of beetle

Neocrepidodera albanica is a species of flea beetle in the leaf beetle family that can be found only in Albania and North Macedonia.
