= Ludwig Reissenberger =

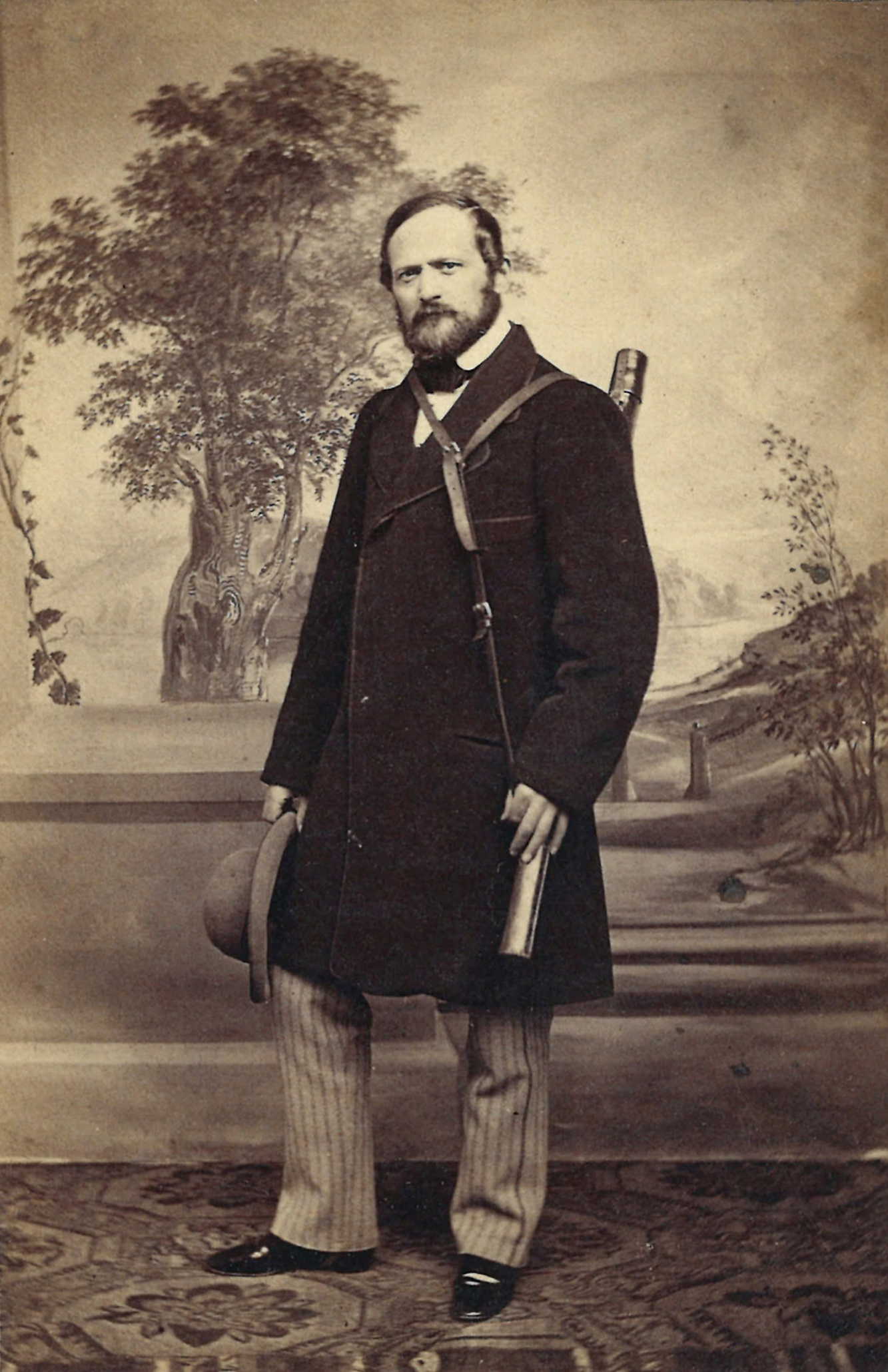

Ludwig Reissenberger (23 January 1819 – 27 November 1895) was a Transylvanian-Saxon meteorologist, art historian and teacher. He is considered as the founder of meteorology in Transylvania.

Reissenberger was born in Sibiu (Hermannstadt), the son of a linen weaver. He went to the local gymnasium before entering the University of Berlin in 1837. He studied theology and natural sciences and travelled from 1839. He began to record meteorological data from 1845. He attended lectures by Karl Ritter on geography and on physics by H. W. Dove. From 1850 he taught at the Brukenthal gymnasium in Hermannstadt and from 1862 he was curator and librarian at the Brukenthal museum and library. He took an interest in natural history, collecting from around the region along with M. J. Ackner, Michael and Karl Fuss, G.A. Kayser, E. A. Bielz and others. From 1851 he was also a corresponding member of the institute for meteorology and earth magnetism in Vienna. He volunteered with the Saxon Guard in 1848-49.

Reissenberger kept information on the first flowering of various local plants from 1851 to 1891 in addition to meteorological data. His observations were cited in a 2016 paper.
