= Neocrepidodera interpunctata =

Scientific classification
- Kingdom: Animalia
- Phylum: Arthropoda
- Class: Insecta
- Order: Coleoptera
- Suborder: Polyphaga
- Infraorder: Cucujiformia
- Family: Chrysomelidae
- Subfamily: Galerucinae
- Tribe: Alticini
- Genus: Neocrepidodera
- Species: N. interpunctata

Binomial name
- Neocrepidodera interpunctata ( Motschulsky, 1859)

Synonyms
- Crepidodera interpunctata Motschulsky, 1859

Species of beetle

Neocrepidodera interpunctata is a species of flea beetle from Chrysomelidae family that can be found in Denmark, Finland, Germany, Poland, Russia, and eastern Palaearctic.
