= Neocrepidodera spectabilis =

Scientific classification
- Kingdom: Animalia
- Phylum: Arthropoda
- Clade: Pancrustacea
- Class: Insecta
- Order: Coleoptera
- Suborder: Polyphaga
- Infraorder: Cucujiformia
- Family: Chrysomelidae
- Subfamily: Galerucinae
- Tribe: Alticini
- Genus: Neocrepidodera
- Species: N. spectabilis

Binomial name
- Neocrepidodera spectabilis (J. Daniel, 1904)

Synonyms
- Crepidodera spectabilis J. Daniel, 1904

Species of beetle

Neocrepidodera spectabilis is a species of flea beetle from a leaf beetle family that can be found in Italy and Switzerland.
