= Édouard Pignon =

French painter

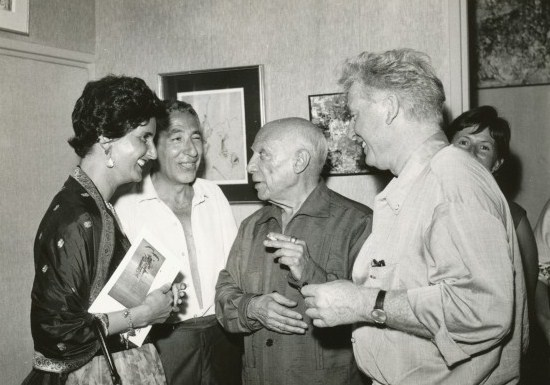
- Pignon (right), with Pablo Picasso, André Verdet and Soshana Afroyim in 1962
- Born: 12 February 1905; Bully-les-Mines, France
- Died: 14 June 1993 (aged 88); La Couture-Boussey, France
- Resting place: Montparnasse Cemetery
- Known for: Painting, ceramic art, lithography
- Spouse: Hélène Parmelin (m. 1947)

Signature
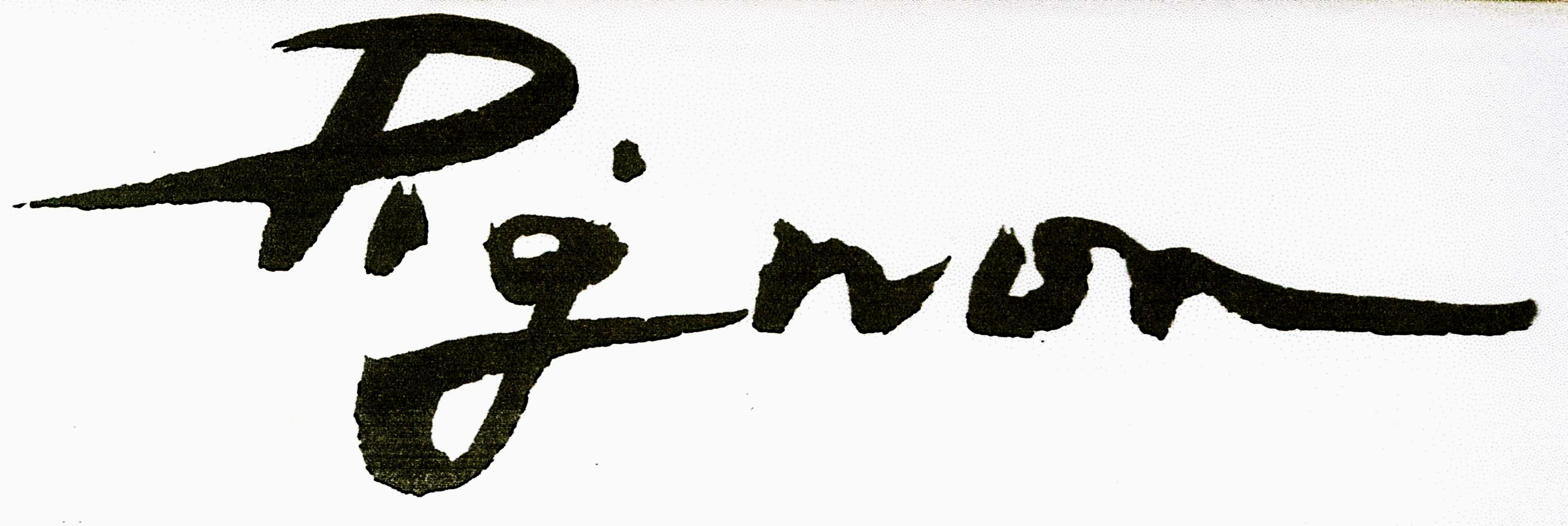

Édouard Pignon (12 February 1905 – 14 May 1993) was a French painter of the School of Paris.

== Biography ==
Pignon was born into the family of a miner involved in the workers' movement. From a young age he was inspired by the paintings of Francisco Goya and himself painted whenever he was not working.

In 1925, Pignon, moved to Paris where he first worked at Citroën and later at the Renault factory and also became a member of the CGTU. In 1932, he participated in the creation and activities of the Indélicats group which published an anarchist magazine.

In 1933 he joined the French Communist Party while he was already a member of Association des écrivains et artistes révolutionnaires, where he met painters such as Jean Hélion, Auguste Herbin, André Marchand, Maurice Estève and Vieira da Silva as well as writers such as Louis Aragon.

In 1935, Pignon was able to devote himself more to painting. From 1936 until the war, he was editor of the weekly Regards.

His first solo exhibition was held in 1939 in Paris. After the German invasion of France, Pignon was mobilized in to the army. He returned to Paris in 1940 and immediately became a member of the Resistance. His house becomes a place of meeting for artists and resistance members such as Aragon and Elsa Triolet who stayed there for some period.

Alongside artists like Jean Bazaine, Esteve, Le Moal and Alfred Manessier, Pignon was one of "Twenty painters of French tradition", who exhibits in Paris at the Braun Galery in 1941 in order to resist the Nazi theory of "degenerate art". With Édouard Goerg and André Fougeron, in 1943 he clandestinely founded the Front National des Arts, a branch of the National Front.

After the war, he collaborated with Jean Vilar and designed the first Avignon festivals. Pignon also came in to conflict with Communist Party for not complying with socialist realism and continued to create figurative artistic works. In 1947 he married the French communist critic Hélène Parmelin. In 1951, at the invitation of his friend Pablo Picasso, Pignon went to the Fournas workshop in Vallauris. In 1956, after the Soviet invasion of Hungary, he was one of ten intellectuals of the PCF alongside who wrote a letter to the party leadership expressing their dismay and condemning the suppression of the Hungarian uprising. In 1960, he was one of the signatories of the Manifesto of the 121.

Throughout the 1960s and 70s his worka have been exhibited in Metz, New York, Amsterdam, Lucerne, Milan, Udine, Padua, Venice, Trieste, Bucharest, Antibes. In 1980, almost all of the artist's works from national museums were collected in an exhibition at the Pompidou Center. In 1981, the French Post Office issued a stamp with a reproduction of one of his paintings, “Red Nudes.” In 1985, an exhibition of his works was displayed on three floors of the Grand Palais in Paris.

From 1986, Pinion began to lose his sight. Édouard Pignon who had been suffering from progressive blindness, died in 1993 in La Couture-Boussey.
