= Hélène Parmelin =

French novelist and art critic (1915–1998)

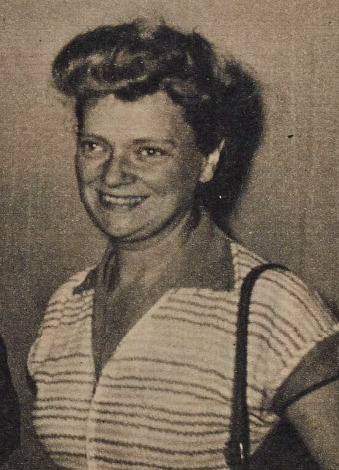
Hélène Parmelin, 1952

Hélène Parmelin (née Hélène Jungelson; 19 August 1915, in Nancy – 6 February 1998, in Paris) was a French novelist, journalist and art critic, best remembered for her novel La Montée du mur (1950) which was nominated for the Prix Fénéon in 1951. A prolific essayist and art historian, especially on the works of Pablo Picasso and her husband Édouard Pignon, her various writings are in the collections of the Institute for Contemporary Publishing Archives.
