= Karl Fuss =

Transylvanian pastor and naturalist

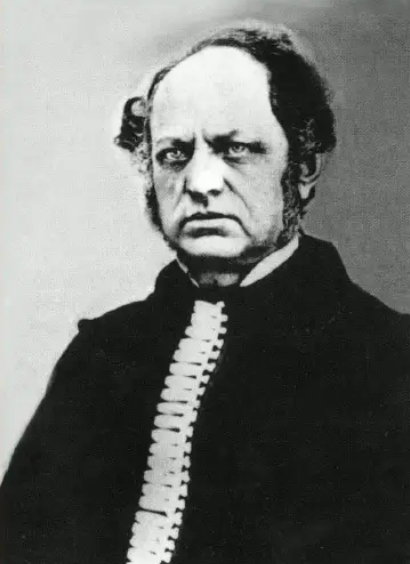

Karl Adolf Fuss (or Fuß) (23 October 1817 – 1 July 1874) was a Protestant city priest in Sibiu and studied the natural history of Transylvania. He is considered the founder of entomology in the region and was involved in establishing the first entomological collections which are now held in the natural history museum at Sibiu.

Fuss was born in Hermannstadt where his father Christian was a teacher at the gymnasium married to Anna Maria née Haas. He studied at the Sibiu School before going to the University of Berlin in 1835 to study natural sciences and theology. He became interested in science thanks to Professor Carl Sigismund Kunth. His older brother Michael was interested in botany. He worked at Hermannstadt as a professor of physics at the Protestant grammar school from 1846 where he collected specimens of natural history. In 1849 he was one of the founders of the Transylvanian association for natural sciences ("Siebenbürgishe Verein für Naturwiessenshaften zu Hermannstadt") although the activities were interrupted by a civil war. He collaborated with others in the region including Ludwig Reissenberger and Eduard Albert Bielz. He began to make an extensive collection of beetles and published on them. He wrote a book on the beetles of Transylvania. He was a member of the Entomological Society of Szczecin, the Zoological Society of Regensburg and other organizations. He taught until 1865 and served as a pastor from 1866.
