= Benjamin Fuß =

German footballer (born 1990)

Personal information
- Full name: Benjamin Fuß
- Date of birth: 28 June 1990 (age 36)
- Place of birth: Bad Salzungen, Bezirk Suhl, East Germany
- Height: 1.82 m (6 ft 0 in)
- Position: Defender

Team information
- Current team: SG Barockstadt
- Number: 17

Youth career
- 2003–2008: FC Carl Zeiss Jena

Senior career*
Years	Team	Apps	(Gls)
2009–2011	FC Carl Zeiss Jena II	34	(2)
2009–2011	FC Carl Zeiss Jena	6	(0)
2011–2015	FSV Zwickau	75	(1)
2015	ZFC Meuselwitz	5	(0)
2015–2018	Borussia Fulda	74	(2)
2018–	SG Barockstadt	39	(1)
- * Club domestic league appearances and goals as of 23 January 2021

Benjamin Fuß (born 28 June 1990 in Bad Salzungen) is a German footballer who plays for SG Barockstadt Fulda-Lehnerz.

== Career ==
Fuß began his career with FC Carl Zeiss Jena who was promoted to the second team on 1 July 2009, on 2 September 2009 made his professional debut in the 3rd Liga against Borussia Dortmund II.
