= Walter Koschatzky =

Austrian art historian, curator and author

- Born: 17 August 1921; Graz, Austria
- Died: 9 May 2003 (aged 81); Vienna, Austria
- Occupations: Art historian Curator; Art history author

Walter Koschatzky (born 17 August 1921 in Graz, Styria, d. 9 May 2003 in Vienna) was an Austrian art historian, curator and art history author.

== Personal life ==
Koschatzky attended the Realgymnasiums Bundeserziehungsanstalt Liebenau, in Graz, until 1936 when he moved to the Military Middle School, also in Liebenau. Between 1940 and 1945 he served in the German armed forces.

In 1945 he commenced studies in art history, archeology, history and philosophy at the University of Graz and graduated in 1952. He had financed his studies with a jazz ensemble, working for the British military broadcasters (britischen Besatzungsmacht betriebene Sendergruppe Alpenland) and the Styrian Provincial Theatre.

Koschatzky married Trude Caroline Bauer in March 1948; she died in July 1994. On 15 July 1996, he married Gabriela Elias, an Austrian author, museum curator and cultural journalist.

Walter Koschatzky was buried in Hietzinger Cemetery in Vienna.

== Career ==
In 1953, Koschatzky joined the Office of the Styrian Government, and moved in 1955 to the Neue Galerie at the Universalmuseum Joanneum in Graz where he worked from 1956 to 1961 as a director. He produced acclaimed art exhibitions, art discussions, lecture series on the radio, art walks in Graz, art tours and activities in public education; he was an eloquent expert on the arts. In 1961, he succeeded Otto Benesch as director of the Albertina ago as his successor.

From 1 January 1962 to 1 October 1986 he was appointed, by Minister of Education Henry Drimmel, as director of the collection of Prints and Drawings at the Albertina in Vienna. During his term, there were more than 200 exhibitions; Koschatzky was one of the most famous directors of museums in Vienna. The list of exhibitions held during his term as director began in 1962 with Gustav Klimt (celebrating Klimt's 100th birthday). Koschatzky curated 100 exhibitions outside the Albertina, including important ones in foreign countries. In 1972, there were exhibitions of important drawings from the Albertina in Moscow and Leningrad; in 1985 in Washington DC and in New York City. In 1986, Koschatzky presented European draftsmanship in Beijing. He continued to produce exhibitions after he had retired.

Koschatzky participated in television programmes about artists.

Between 1973 and 1989, he taught at the Universities of Vienna and Salzburg.

== Partial bibliography ==
Koschatzky wrote numerous works on art history, including:

Die Albertina in Wien (The Albertina in Vienna) (with Alice Strobl; 1959)
Anton Lehmden (1970)
Die Kunst der Graphik. Technik, Geschichte, Meisterwerke (The art of the Graphic. Technology, History, Masterpieces) (1972, Taschenbuch 1975)
Rudolf von Alt 1812–1905 (1975; significantly expanded edition in 2001 with his second wife Gabriela Koschatzky Elias)
Mit Nadel und Säure (With needle and acid) (1982)
Die Kunst von Stein (The Art of Stone) (with Kristian Sotriffer; 1985)

In 2001, Koschatzky published his autobiography, Faszination Kunst.

== Decorations and awards ==
- Austrian Cross of Honour for Science and Art, 1st class (1977)
- Grand Decoration of Honour for Services to the Republic of Austria (1983)
- Commander of the Royal Norwegian Order of St. Olav (1967)
- Commander of the Order of the British Empire (1969)
- Commander of the Order of the Crown (Belgium) (1971)
- Great Cross of Merit of the Federal Republic of Germany (1979)
- Commander of the Order of the Polar Star, 1st class (Sweden, 1980)
- Gold Honorary Medal of Vienna (1981)
- Grand Golden Decoration of Styria (1981)
- Honorary Ring of Styria (1996)
- Honorary Ring of the city of Graz (2002)
