= Max G. Bollag =

Max G. Bollag (6 December 1913 - 13 September 2005) was a Swiss gallery owner. Primarily active in Zurich, he was best known for his Pablo Picasso exhibitions.

== Life ==
Max G. Bollag was born into a long-established Jewish family and grew up in Zurich with his sisters Suzanne, Amélie and his twin, Mary. His father, Léon Bollag [1876-1958] and uncle Gustave [1873-1953] opened a gallery in Zurich in 1913 while his mother, Betty Moos, together with her brother, Max Moos, worked in their Geneva gallery. Max Bollag opened a Gallery Modern Art Center on Zurich's Rämistrasse and shortly afterwards in the Zunfthaus zur Meisen.

In 1940 he moved his art gallery to Lausanne. Bollag showed paintings by Cuno Amiet, Johann Heinrich Füssli, Alberto Giacometti, and also early works by Pablo Picasso, among others. In addition to the exhibitions, he organized two-day auctions.

In 1946, Bollag opened his gallery at Storchengasse 9 in Zurich. Works by Paul Klee, Vasily Kandinsky and Picasso were shown here. Auctions at that time could only be held twice a year with a peddler's patent. At first the auctions were held in the Zunfthaus, then in the Kongresshaus.

In 1949 Bollag married Susi Aeppli, the daughter of Ernst Aeppli and Gertrud Zschokke. Four children were born of this union.

In 1950 he founded the Swiss Society of Friends of Art Auctions, which made it possible to hold auctions in the gallery in closed company.

 [9] The membership fee was 5 francs per year. Works of art were auctioned every two months.

In 1963, after several stops, the gallery premises were located on Werdmühlestrasse. He built a very close professional relationship with Daniel Schinasi, the founder of the Neofuturism, showing a passionate support on his painting and style. Max Bollag and Daniel Schinasi collaborated for more than 40 years by the 60's till Max elderly age and remain friends.In 1998, Bollag retired from his work at the age of 85. He died on September 13, 2005.

Picasso's Still Life with Portrait, which was stolen during the Nazi period from Dr Meyer-Udewald, reappeared after World War II at the Bollag gallery which sold it to the Galerie Benador in Geneva from which the Phillips Collection acquired it. A settlement was reached with the heirs.

Seven Picassos were stolen from the Bollag gallery in 1974. They were found and returned six years later.

Museums throughout the world have artworks that Bollag sold, including the National Gallery of Art in Washington D.C. and the Metropolitan Museum of Art.

A sale of artworks from Bollag's was organized by Christie's in 2018.

== Literature ==
- Daniele Muscionico: "Der Liebhaber und die Kunst" – Max G. Bollag, Kunstförderer und Galerist, wird 90 Jahre alt. In: NZZ Online, 6 December 2003, retrieved 10 December 2011.
- Willi Wottreng: "Paradiesvogel im Kunstgarten" – Max G. Bollag, der eine ungewöhnliche Kunstgalerie betrieb, ist 91-jährig gestorben. In: NZZ 25 September 2005, retrieved 10 December 2011.
- 2007 drehte Anne Cuneo ein filmisches Porträt des "Pioniers in Sachen Kunstausstellungen"
