= Camille Bourniquel =

French poet, novelist and painter

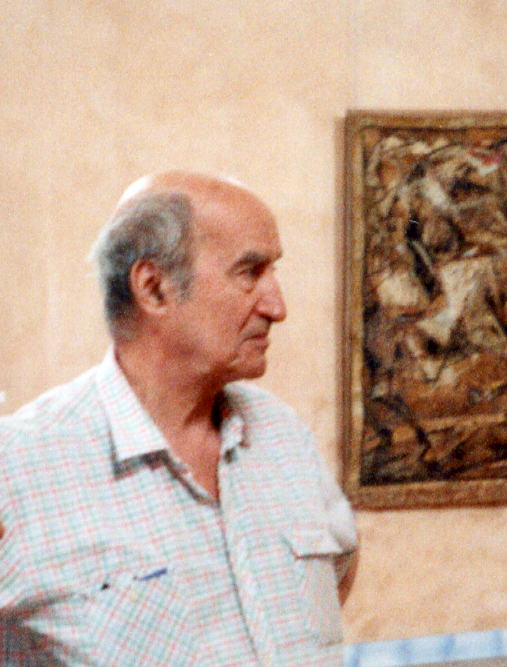
Camille Bourniquel in 1997, Jean Bertholle exhibition, La Ciotat

Camille Bourniquel (7 March 1918 – 1 April 2013) was a French poet, novelist and painter.

== Life ==
Born in Paris, Bourniquel became friends with the poets and painters of his generation, François Baron-Renouard, Bazaine, Bertholle, Elvire Jan, Hartung, Jean Le Moal, Manessier, Pignon, Singier. He wrote prefaces, articles and numerous columns in art journals.

Bourniquel joined the magazine Esprit in 1946 and became its literary director in 1957.

In 1963 he wrote the texts of three art films about his painter friends and in 2004 donated works by Manessier (L’Homme à la branche, 1942; Composition bleue, 1942; Printemps, 1968; Cheminée au Bignon, 1945), Elvire Jan (L’atelier II, 1942) and Singier (Enfant jouant aux cubes, 1943) to the musée Unterlinden of Colmar.

Bourniquel died in Paris at age 95.

== Laureates ==
- Prix du Renouveau in 1953 for Retour à Cirgue.
- Plume d'or du Figaro littéraire in 1966 for Le Lac.
- Prix Médicis in 1970 for Sélinonte ou la Chambre impériale.
- Grand prix du roman de l'Académie française in 1977 for Tempo (novel).
- Prix Chateaubriand in 1981 for L'Empire Sarkis.

== Bibliography ==
- Le Moal, Manessier, Singier, Galerie René Drouin, Paris, 1946.
- Quatrains, Burins de Singier, Éditions de la Galerie Biliet-Caputo, Paris, 1949.
- Retour à Cirgue, novel, Le Seuil, Paris, 1953 (Prix du Renouveau).
- Le Blé sauvage, novel, Le Seuil, Paris, 1955.
- Irlande, Collections Microcosme "Petite Planète", Le Seuil, Paris, 1955.
- Les Créateurs et le sacré, Textes et témoignages de Delacroix à nos jours with Jean Guichard-Meili, Éditions du Cerf, Paris, 1956.
- Chopin, Microcosme "Solfèges", Le Seuil, Paris, 1957.
- Les Abois, novel, Le Seuil, Paris, 1957.
- L'Été des solitudes, novel, Le Seuil, Paris, 1960.
- Le Lac, novel, Le Seuil, Paris, 1964 (Golden feather of le Figaro littéraire). Éditions de Fallois, Paris, 2000.
- La Maison verte, short stories, Le Seuil, Paris, 1966.
- Les Gardiens, theatre, Le Seuil, Paris, 1969.
- Sélinonte ou la Chambre impériale, Le Seuil, Paris, 1970 (Prix Médicis) ISBN 2020011476.
- Sentier d'Hermès, poems, 21 drawings by Alfred Manessier, Galanis, Paris, 1971.
- L'Enfant dans la cité des ombres, Grasset, Paris, 1973.
- La Constellation des lévriers, novel, Le Seuil, Paris, 1975.
- Rencontre, series Idée Fixe, Julliard, Paris, 1976.
- Tempo, novel, Paris, Julliard, 1977 (Grand prix du roman de l'Académie française) ISBN 2-260-00090-8.
- L'Enfant dans la cité des ombres, seven lithographs by Manessier, Le Livre contemporain & les Bibliophiles Franco-Suisses, Paris, 1978.
- Le Soleil sur la rade, novel, Julliard, Paris, 1979.
- L'Empire Sarkis, novel, Julliard, Paris, 1981 (Prix Chateaubriand).
- Le Jugement dernier, novel, Julliard, Paris, 1983.
- Elvire Jan, Éditions Guitardes, Paris, 1984.
- Le Manège d'hiver, novel, Julliard, Paris, 1986.
- Le Jardin des délices, Paris, Mercure de France, 1987.
- La Féerie et le royaume, original lithographs by Marc Chagall, Mourlot, Paris.
- Karma, tale, Éditions de Fallois, Paris, 1999.
- Queen Alicia, novel, Éditions de Fallois, Paris, 2004 ISBN 287706493X.
- Poèmes, Éditions de Fallois, Paris, 2004.
- Paul Valéry, Dernier dîner à Auteuil, 2009
