= Gaston Diehl =

French art professor (1912–1999)

Gaston Diehl (10 August 1912 – 12 December 1999) was a French professor of art history and an art critic.

== Biography ==
Diehl graduated from the Institut d'Art et d'Archéologie in 1934 and the Ecole du Louvre in 1936. In October 1935, Diel and his classmates formed a student group called 'Regain', where they conducted a weekly review of the same name dedicated to discuss once or twice a month of contemporary creativity with different artists in the basement of the Capoulade Quartier. Beginning 1938, Diehl participated in the weekly magazine Marianne and kept for a year a chronicle of art called "The rostrum of Youth." In 1939, he founded the magazine Charpentes.

In October 1943, during the Nazi Occupation, Diehl founded the May Salon in Paris in a café on the Palais Royal, in opposition to the ideology of Nazism and its condemnation of degenerate art. Its other founder-members were Henri-Georges Adam, Emmanuel Auricoste, Lucien Coutaud, Robert Couturier, Jacques Despierre, Marcel Gili, Leon Gischia, Francis Gruber, René Iché, Jean Le Moal, Alfred Manessier, André Marchand, Edouard Pignon, Gustave Singier, Claude Venard and Roger Vieillard. Several of them (Coutaud, Gischia, Iché, Le Moal, Manessier, Marchand, Pignon, Singier) had in 1941 participated in the exhibition of Twenty young painters of French tradition. The first May Salon took place at the Galerie Pierre Maurs from 29 May to 29 June 1945.

Diehl created in October 1944 the Movement of Friends of Art for the dissemination of the modern art through lectures, screenings, films, educational exhibitions particularly in the provinces. He was close to Rouault, and the young painters of French tradition which he prefaced exhibitions from 1943 at the Galerie de France. Diehl also helped with the exhibitions of Bonnard, Matisse, Picasso, Villon, Braque, Bernard Buffet and Hans Hartung, and thus, accordingly including the testimony of Pierre Restany that he "was very conscious writer who had a foot in the first half of his century and another in the second." In 1948, Diehl played a role in the creation of the International Film Festival of Art and contributed to the films: Van Gogh (1948), which won an Academy Award for Best Live Action Short Film in 1950 and Gauguin (1950) with Alain Resnais and Christmas galantes (Watteau) (1950) with Jean Aurel.

In September 1950, Diehl was appointed professor by the Ministry of Foreign Affairs in Venezuela at the Central University of Venezuela and the School of Fine Arts where he taught art history. As a cultural attache at the embassy, he also directed the Franco-Venezuelan Institute, and wrote articles in the press in Europe and Latin America. He helped artists like Carlos Cruz-Diez and Jesús-Rafael Soto to gain recognition in Europe.

From 1950 to 1966, Diehl played a similar role in Morocco following in the footsteps of Delacroix and Matisse. In February 1966, he directed the Bureau des Expositions de l'Action Artistique, Ministry of Foreign Affairs, and took until his retirement in 1977 the task of start with the help of curators, critics and friends of exhibitions in France at the Grand and Petit Palais and the Louvre (including The Treasury Toutankamon in 1960).

Diehl continued until his death to support art in all its forms and in the world and was elected President of the Museum of Latin America in 1983, and helped introduce Latin American artists at the House of Latin America in Monte Carlo from 1986 to 1998.

== Works ==
- Jumana El Husseini . http://jumanaelhusseini.com/Home.html
- Peintres d'aujourd'hui. Les maîtres, Charpentier, Paris, 1943, 36 p.
- Les problèmes de la peinture, sous la direction de Gaston Diehl, éditions Confluences, 1945.
- Édouard Goerg, éditions de Clermont, Paris, 1947, 94 p.
- Asselin, éditions Rombaldi, Paris, 1947.
- Vermeer, éditions Hyperion, Paris-New York, 1949, 48 p.
- Matisse, Nathan, Paris, 1950, 48 p.
- Le Dessin en France au XIXè siècle, éditions Hyperion, Paris-New York, 1950, 100 p.
- Matisse, Paris, Pierre Tisné, 1954, 310 p.
- Pintura venezolana, Creole Petroleum, Caracas, 1958.
- El Arte moderno frances en Caracas, cuatro Vientos, Caracas, 1959, 32 p.
- Picasso, Flammarion, Paris, 1960, 96 p.
- La Peinture moderne dans le monde, Flammarion, Paris, 1961, 220 p.
- Derain, Flammarion, Paris, 1964, 96 p.
- Singier et l'art français contemprain, éditions marocaines et internationales, Tanger, 1965
- Goya, Flammarion, Paris, 1966, 48p.
- Greco, Flammarion, Paris, 1966, 48 p.
- Gauguin, Flammarion, Paris, 1966, 48 p.
- Van Gogh, Flammarion, Paris, 1966, 48 p.
- Delacroix, Flammarion, Paris, 1966, 48 p.
- Pascin, Flammarion, Paris, 1968, 96 p.
- Van Dongen, Flammarion, Paris, 1968, 96 p.
- Hector Poleo, Inciba, Caracas, 1969, 74 p.
- Matisse, Paris, Nouvelles éditions françaises, 1970, 159 p.
- Les Fauves, Paris, Nouvelles éditions françaises, 1971, 192 p.
- Vasarely, Paris, Flammarion, 1972, 96 p.
- Max Ernst, Paris, Flammarion, 1973, 96 p.
- Miró, Paris, Flammarion, 1974, 96 p.
- Perez Celis, Ed. de arte Gaglianone, Buenos Aires, 1981, 200 p.
- Fernand Léger, Flammarion, Paris, 1985, 96 p.
- Amedeo Modigliani, Paris, Flammarion, 1989.
- Kremègne : l'expressionnisme sublimé, Navarin, Paris, 1990, 237 p.
- Oswaldo Vigas, Armitano, Caracas, 1990, 296 p. (en français, 1993).
- Georges Papazoff, Paris, Cercle d'art, 1995.
- La Peinture en France dans les années noires, 1935-1945, Z'éditions, Nice, 1999.
