= Étienne Martin =

French sculptor (1913–1995)

- Born: Henri Étienne-Martin; 4 February 1913; Loriol, Drôme, France
- Died: 21 March 1995 (aged 82); Paris, France
- Occupation: Sculptor

Étienne Martin (4 February 1913 – 21 March 1995) was a French non-figurative sculptor.

== Early life and education ==
He was born Henri Étienne-Martin on 4 February 1913 in Loriol, Drôme, France. He attended the Ecole des Beaux Arts de Lyon from 1929 to 1933, where he met Marcel Michaud.

== Career ==
=== Paris ===
Martin moved to Paris in 1934, working at the studio of Charles Malfray at the Académie Ranson, where he came into contact with such painters as Roger Bissière, Jean Le Moal, Jean Bertholle, Alfred Manessier, Zelman, Véra Pagava, and the sculptor François Stahly. With them, Martin became part of the group Témoignage, which had exhibitions in Paris in 1938 and 1939. He worked primarily in wood and plaster, creating works inspired by his childhood memories of his home in Loriol. Later sculpture included bronze, string, and textiles.

During World War II, Martin was a prisoner in Germany and was liberated in 1941. In 1942, he traveled to Oppède with Stahly and Zelman, and then in 1943–1944 went to Dieulefit, Drôme, where he met the writer Henri-Pierre Roché. Next, Martin moved to Mortagne-au-Perche, Normandy.

=== Post-war Paris ===
On his return to Paris in 1947 he lived with Roché, and he met Brâncuși and Gurdjieff. Over the next dozen years, Martin became spiritual, practicing Eastern religions, including Taoism. In 1952, Martin exhibited alongside François Stahly, Juana Muller and Marie-Thérèse Pinto in a group exhibition at the galerie MAI (Meubles Architectures Installations) in Paris.

In 1954, Martin began his series of Demeures (Dwellings), for which he became well known. He received in 1966 the grand prize for sculpture in the 33rd Venice Biennale. He was a professor and head of the sculpture department from 1968 to 1983 at the École nationale supérieure des Beaux-Arts in Paris. He was elected in 1971 to the Académie des beaux-arts.

In 1984, an exhibition bringing together all Martin's Demeures was held at the Pompidou Center in Paris. In 2010, from June to September, a new exhibition at the Pompidou Center paid respect to the artist by showing 15 sculptures, drawing, personal notebooks, and photographs of his studio.

== Personal life ==
Martin died in Paris on 21 March 1995, from cardiac arrest.

== Works ==
His large abstract sculptures build on inspiration of empty spaces delimited by volume.

- Grand couple, bronze, 1947, at the Fondation Pierre Gianadda, Martigny, Switzerland
- La nuit ouvrante, bronze, 1948, in the Museum of Grenoble
- Tête aux mains, bronze, 1950–1951, in the Musée de Dijon
- Lanleff-Demeure No. 4, bronze, 1961, Nathan Manilow Sculpture Park
- Demeure 4, 1961, at the Maison de la Culture d'Amiens
- Le Manteau, 1962, in the Pompidou Center, Paris. This was the first fabric in sculpture at this Museum and gained him wide recognition.
- Trois Personnages, 1967, at the Fondation de Coubertin, Saint-Rémy lès Chevreuse, Yvelines
- Abécédaire, 1967, in the Pompidou Center, Paris
- Le Passage, 1969, at the Musée d'Art Moderne de la Ville de Paris
- Le cerbère, chestnut, 1977, in the Musée de Lyon
- Mur miroir, 1979, in the Pompidou Center, Paris
- L'Escalier, wood, metal, plexiglass, rope, paint, 1983, at the Musée de Valence
- Le collier de la nuit; Les eaux souterraines du désir, mixed media, 1985, in the Museum of Grenoble
- La Ruine, L'Athanor, Demeure 1, at the Bois Orcan in Noyal-sur-Vilaine, (Ille-et-Vilaine)
- Demeure at the Middelheim Open Air Sculpture Museum, Antwerp

== See also ==
- Élisabeth Cibot, a student
