= Jean Lescure =

French poet (1912–2005)

Jean Lescure (French: [ʒɑ̃ lɛskyʁ]; 14 September 1912 – 17 October 2005) was a French poet.

== Biography ==
Lescure was born in Asnières-sur-Seine. In 1938, he published his first plaquette of poems, "Le voyage immobile", and launched the review "Messages" (two issues in 1939: "William Blake" and "Metaphysics and poetry").

During the Occupation Lescure resumed editing "Messages" in 1942, printed in Brussels, with Paul Éluard, Raymond Queneau, Michel Leiris, Gaston Bachelard, Georges Bataille, Jean Paulhan, Guillevic, André Frénaud. "Domaine français" (Messages 1943) was printed in Geneva (Louis Aragon, Gaston Bachelard, Albert Camus, Paul Claudel, Paul Éluard, André Gide, Michel Leiris, François Mauriac, Henri Michaux, Francis Ponge, Romain Rolland, Raymond Queneau, Jean-Paul Sartre, Paul Valéry).

Jean Lescure became co-director of the clandestine review "Les Lettres françaises" and was one of the founders of the underground organization, the "Comité National des Ecrivains". After the Liberation he was appointed director of the French Radio. He was an early member of Oulipo.

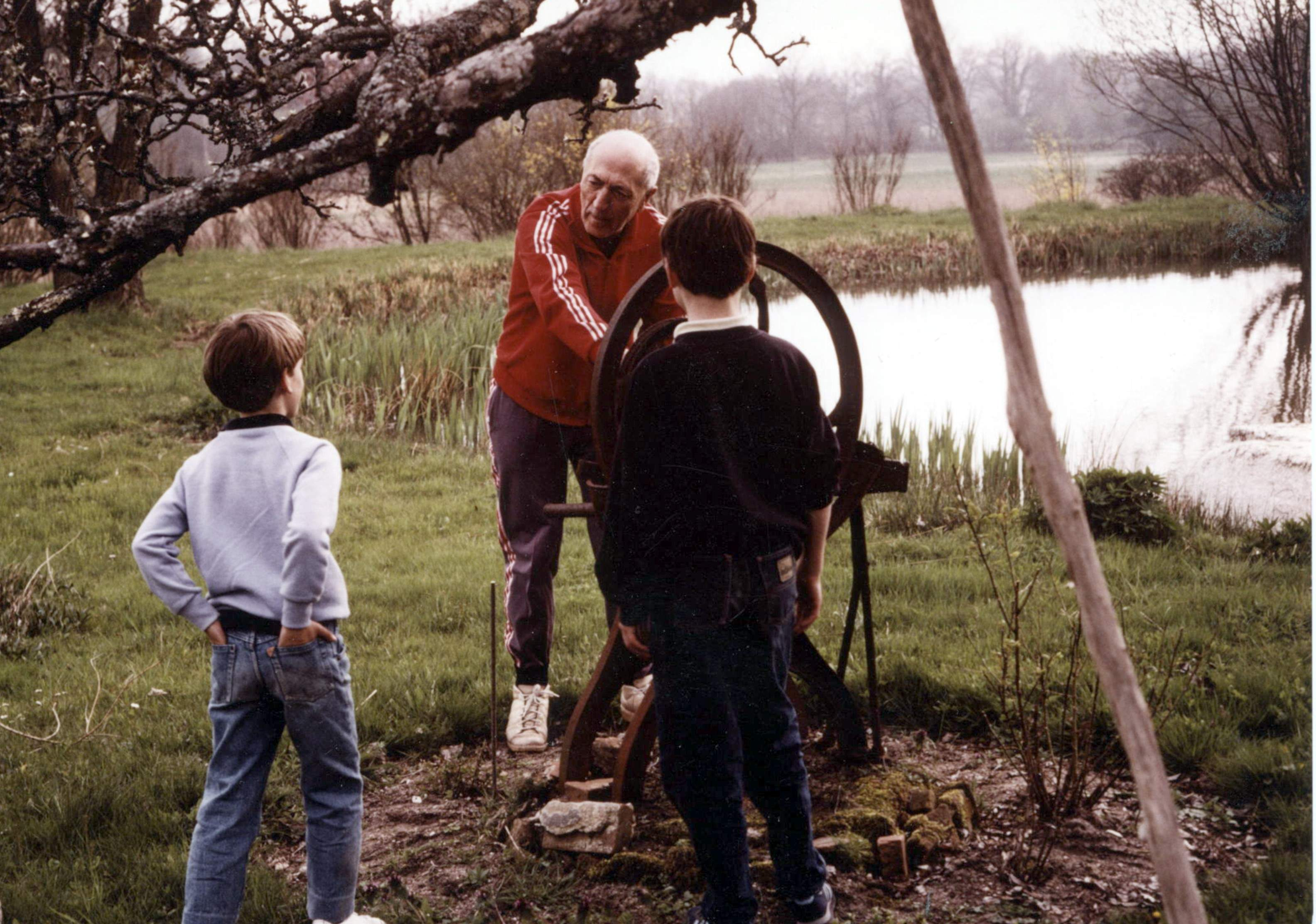
Jean Lescure, 1986

Lescure translated Shakespeare's "Measure for Measure" (1949) and the complete works of Giuseppe Ungaretti (1953). He wrote introductions to the work of many French artists (Bertholle, Chastel, Estève, Gischia, Lapicque, Pignon, Prassinos, Singier, Ubac) and essays on the philosopher Gaston Bachelard and André Malraux. He died, aged 93, in Paris.

== Selected bibliography ==
=== Poems ===
- Le Voyage immobile, Jean Flory, Paris, 1936.
- Une anatomie du secret, Ides et Calendes, Neuchâtel et Paris, 1946.
- Les Falaises de Taormina, Np., Limoges, 1949.
- La Plaie ne se ferme pas, Charlot, Paris, 1949.
- Treize poèmes, Gallimard, Paris, 1960.
- Noires compagnes de mes murs, Florentin Mouret, Avignon, 1961.
- Drailles, Gallimard, Paris, 1968.
- Itinéraires de la nuit, Clancier-Guénaud, Paris, 1982.
- Il Trionfo della morte, Clancier-Guénaud, Paris, 1984.
- La Belle Jardinière, Clancier-Guénaud, Paris, 1988.
- Le Satyre est con, Editions Proverbe, Marchainville, 1998.
- Gnomides, Editions Proverbe, Marchainville, 1999.
- Journal de la Boue, Editions Proverbe, Marchainville, 2001.
- Feuilles de tremble, Editions Proverbe, Marchainville, 2001.
- Poèmes métaphysiques (1938–1946), Editions Proverbe, Marchainville, 2002.

=== Essays ===
- Exercice de la pureté, Messages 1942, III, Paris, 1942.
- Charles Lapicque, Flammarion, Paris, 1956.
- Dessins de Charles Lapicque, La mer, Editions Galanis, Paris, 1964.
- Images d’images, Editions Galanis, Paris, 1964.
- D’une obscure clarté, Jean Bertholle, Villand et Galanis, Paris, 1966.
- Un été avec Bachelard, Luneau Ascot éditeurs, Paris, 1983.
- Album Malraux, Bibliothèque de la Pléiade, Gallimard, Paris, 1986.
- Bachelard aujourd'hui, présenté par Jean Lescure, Clancier-Guénaud, Paris, 1986.
- Gischia ou les raisons de la couleur, Éditions de l'Orycte, Paris, 1987.
- Gustave Singier, Canicule à Patmos, Guitardes et Galerie Arnoux, Paris, 1988.
- Le Même est toujours un autre, Georges Dayez, Editions Jean-Pierre Joubert, Paris, 1991.
- Poésie et Liberté, Histoire de "Messages", 1939-1946, Editions de l’IMEC, Paris, 1998.
- En écoutant Fautrier, L'Echoppe, Paris, 1998.
- Benjamin Fondane, Le gouffre et le mur, Editions Proverbe, Marchainville, 1999.
- Léon Gischia, Sketchbook, Editions Proverbe, Marchainville, 2000.
- André Malraux, Pour une antibiographie, Éditions de l'Orycte, Paris, 2004.
- Mario Prassinos, Éditions de l'Orycte, hors commerce, Paris, 2005.

== Sources ==
- Jean Lescure, Poésie et Liberté, Histoire de "Messages", 1939-1946, Editions de l'Institut mémoires de l'édition contemporaine (IMEC), Paris, 1998.
- Michel-Georges Bernard, Jean Lescure, "Dictionnaire de Poésie de Baudelaire à nos jours", Presses Universitaires de France, Paris, 2001.
- Michel-Georges Bernard, Jean Lescure ou Les matins de la parole, "Poésie/première", n° 29, Editions Editinter, Soisy-sur-Seine, juillet-octobre 2004.
