= Charles Malfray =

French sculptor

Charles Malfray (19 July 1887, Orléans – 28 May 1940, Dijon) was a French sculptor.

Born the son of an Orléans stonemason he was a student of the École des Beaux-Arts d'Orléans. At seventeen, he attended the School of Decorative Arts in Paris and the École nationale supérieure des Beaux-Arts. He however rejected the academic teaching of the college and became attracted by the art of the Montmartre-based Auguste Rodin and Antoine Bourdelle.

Malfray survived the First World War after being gassed and taking part in the Battle of Verdun, but was deeply affected by his experiences. Together with his brother, he created war memorials to the dead of Pithiviers (1920) and Orleans (1924), whose modernism was highly debated. In 1919 he was awarded the Prix Blumenthal, but due to being ill as a result of the war, he almost gave up sculpture.

However, in 1931, his friend Aristide Maillol appointed him his successor as professor at the Académie Ranson in Paris. During the following years, Malfray had many students in his workshop, including Étienne Martin, François Stahly, Nessa Cohen, and Jean Le Moal.

He died in 1940. A street in Orléans was named Rue Charles Malfray.

== Main works ==
- Lyon, Musée des Beaux-Arts, Torse de nageuse
- Orléans, Musée des Beaux-Arts, La Danse (bronze), Femme assise (bronze), Le Baiser (plaster), La Beauce (plaster), Torse de baigneuse (plaster), Homme marchant avec une besace (plaster), Torse de femme (plaster), Deux baigneuses (plaster), La Danse (plaster)
- Paris, Musée d'art moderne, La Danse, 1939

== Bibliography ==
- Jacques de Laprade, Charles Malfray, dessins et sculptures, Mourlot, Paris, 1945
- Charles Malfray, André Chamson, Paris, Petit Palais, 1947
- Charles Malfray, Waldemar George, Paris, Musée Rodin, 1966
- Hommage à Charles Malfray, Orléans, Musée des Beaux-Arts, 1967
