= ORAZI =

French painter (1906–1979)

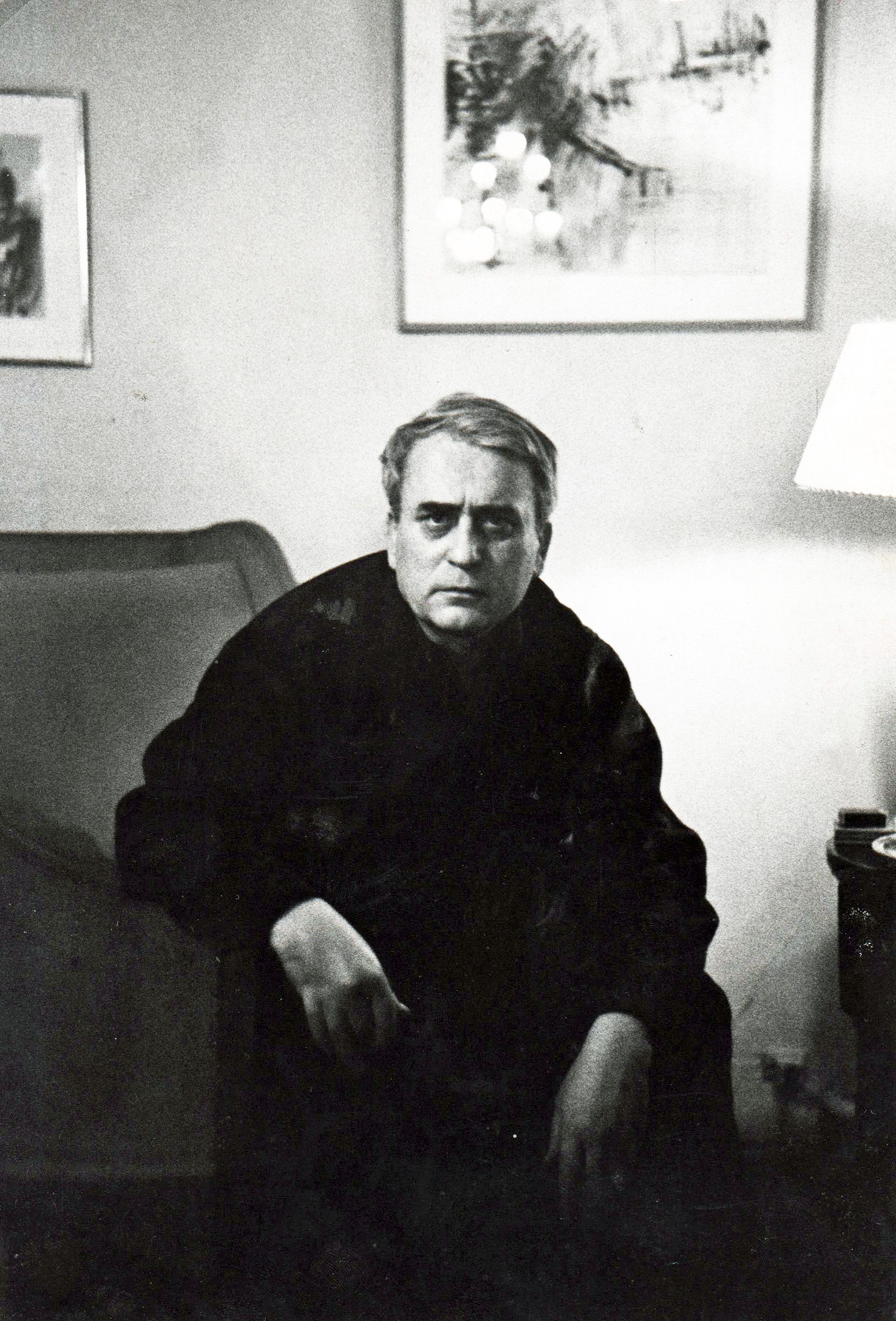
- ORAZI c. 1960
- Born: 28 February 1906; France
- Died: 19 January 1979 (aged 72)
- Movement: nouvelle École de Paris

ORAZI (who wrote his name in capital letters), was born in 1906 and died in 1979. He was a painter of the French School (École Française) and a member of the School of Paris (École de Paris or nouvelle École de Paris).

His works shifted from figurative art to abstract art, which was often characterised by matter in relief rising from the canvas surface. He called this phase Peinture en Relief (Painting in Relief). He returned to figurative painting in his latest phase.

In Paris, he had his studio on Boulevard du Montparnasse from 1934. At that time, the district of Montparnasse had replaced Montmartre as the artistic centre of Paris. After the Second World War, in 1946–1947, he moved to another atelier in a quiet street of Montparnasse and he maintained the same address until his death.

He steadily exhibited his works, for over three decades from 1947 until his death at the Salon de Mai, of which he became a "historic member". The Salon de Mai was the art association founded in Paris in 1943 (declared in 1944) in opposition to Nazi ideology. In the introductory note to the 1979 Catalogue of the Salon de Mai, "La volonté de Continuer" (the will to continue), his death was remembered by Gaston Diehl, Founding President, with these words: "I care to remember those who have recently left us [...] and most especially two painters who were for so long faithful companions in our artistic path: ORAZI and BURTIN."

In 1952 he was appointed a member (Sociétaire) of the Painting Section of the Salon d'Automne Society, the Parisian art institution founded in 1903 with the aim of encouraging development of the fine arts and organizing the annual art exhibition the Salon d'Automne.

Throughout his career, from 1932 until his death in 1979, he participated in a long series of exhibitions, including many solo exhibitions, mostly in Paris, but also elsewhere in France, Italy, other parts of Europe, America, and Japan. There have also been some solo exhibitions after his death, from 1980 to 2006.

In 2009, the American photographer and artist Peter Beard reproduced four paintings by ORAZI - from his Peintures en Relief (Paintings in Relief) - in the Pirelli Calendar.

For his artistic career, he adopted the pseudonym ORAZI. The name derives from the Roman antiquity and represented in the artistic field - since the 17th century - by a series of artists of the same family tree, active in France but who were originally from the Bologna area and central Italy.

== Career ==
In 1937 the Parisian art gallery 'Galerie de Paris' organised his solo exhibition. In 1937 and 1938, he exhibited at the First and Second Salon des Jeunes Artistes in Paris.

He was again in Italy. His paintings (Paulette; Wally; Young woman dressed in blue) were exhibited in 1934 and 1936 at the 'Esposizione Internazionale d'Arte di Venezia', the 'Venice Biennale', an international cultural event increasingly important, and in 1935 at the 'Quadriennale d'Arte Nazionale', in Rome (Jasmine;Young woman resting with her cat).

The works of those years, until approximately 1946, were essentially portraits, still lifes, landscapes, and compositions. They highlight the distinctive elements of ORAZI's painting, which was characterized not only by its ties with the historic French Avant-gardes, but also the great names of the French Post-impressionist art. The research on colour, in the physical representation of objects and characters, takes a predominant place in all those works.

The French art critic Jean-Pierre Pietri called ORAZI's new style Peinture du Mouvement (Painting the Movement), reflecting his search for dynamic and plastic effects of human gesture and animal movement, alongside the strength of colours.

In his tempera L'Exode he depicted a long convoy of refugees fleeing Nazi invasion: it was exhibited in Paris at the Salon d'Automne of 1952.

The paintings of the Peinture du Mouvement, a series dedicated to Circus characters (clowns, horsewomen, riders, athletes, ballet dancers), were exhibited in Paris, at the Salon de Mai in 1952 and 1953, at the Salon d'Automne and at the Deuxième Biennale de Menton in 1953, at ORAZI's solo exhibition held at the Parisian art gallery 'Galerie Marcel Bernheim' in 1954.

Moreover, he painted a series of large compositions representing Historic Battles (and also officers on horseback, Dragoons and Carabinieri): some of them were exhibited at the Salon de Mai of 1955 and 1956, at the Salon des Indépendants of 1957, in Paris, and at the Milanese art gallery 'L'Annunciata' in 1959.

In 1954, the editorial staff of the journal Les Lettres Françaises proposed to ORAZI illustrating the short-story titled The Story of a Soldier Who Brought a Cannon Home, written by the journalist and novelist Italo Calvino.

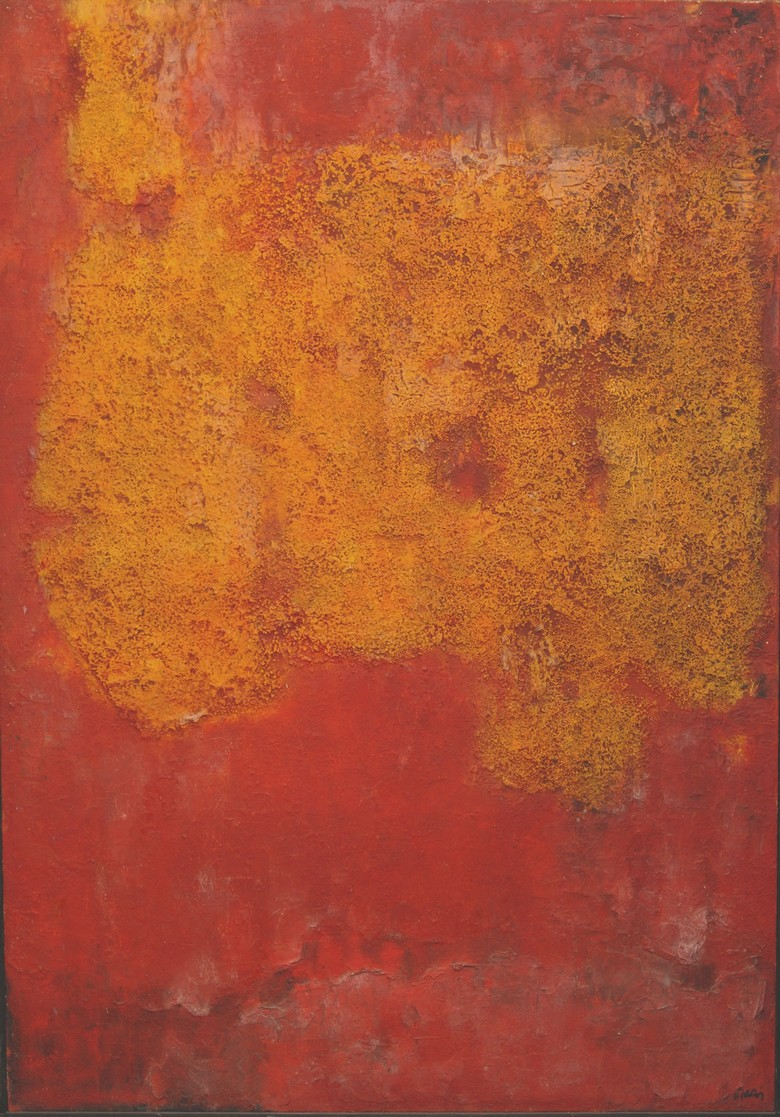
ORAZI' Été – Summertime, 1959

From the end of the Fifties, ORAZI worked in abstract art. He showed his paintings at the Salon de Mai of 1960 and 1961, and above all in a solo exhibition held in Paris at the 'Galerie 7', in 1961. This exhibit was introduced to the public by the French art critic and writer Michel Courtois, and was praised by the critics. The French edition of the New York Herald Tribune wrote that he "shows succulently painted variations on single tones - gold, red, tender blue - [...] And yet these apostrophes to pure colour do have a life on their own and a craftsmanship that delights the eye. He is one of a group of painters who are trying to put European abstractart on its feet, so that it can stand without American aid, and he may succeed."

ORAZI's art was based on nature, its elements, and its phenomena (flowers, sands, stones, rocks, volcanic lava, streams, sea shores, sea beds, eruptions, storms, petrified meteorites). The art critic Jean-Jacques Lévèque wrote on ORAZI's exhibition of 1966 at the Parisian art gallery 'Galerie du Passeur': "With ORAZI, who exhibits at the Gallery of the Passeur[...] it is a spectacle. A natural spectacle, of the life of soil, of the harsh and poignant thrusts that structure the natural world. Knotty, convulsive shapes suddenly take hold of space and in their irresistible momentum blossom beyond the limits imposed by the paintings' frame."

ORAZI's works were, at first, in low relief. One of them, Été (Summer), has been exhibited at the Salon de Mai of 1962, not only in Paris but also in Tokyo, Osaka, and Yawata. Then, the relief became progressively higher, and the shapes extended beyond the limits of the canvas and chassis. They have been annually exhibited at the Salon de Mai, in Paris, from 1962 to 1979, as well as in other exhibitions in France and Europe, among which the ORAZI's solo exhibition of 1966 at the art gallery 'Galerie du Passeur', in Paris. A drawing of the work by ORAZI entitled Alpha-Oméga was reproduced on the invitation brochure to the 1966 exhibition; Alpha-Oméga would also have been exhibited at the Salon de Mai of 1971.

The critic of the time was very positive, as expressed in an article written by the French art critic Raoul-Jean Moulin: "[...] the painter puts under test the stone, the plant, the air, the light[...] Natural materials, harsh and whirling, streams of eruptive lava, petrified meteorites[...] moments in the formation of the universe."; or as in Georges Boudaille's: "Matter is embossed, rises now like the earth's crust, now like petals of flowers; forms proliferate and leave the limits of the frame to invade space[...] there are lands, but also volcanic lava, tree barks, rocks, mountains."

Quite often Paintings in Relief demonstrate ORAZI's tendency to create circular shapes on the canvas surface. This tendency became fundamental in the next artistic phase (1970–1977), called ''Ligne Circulaire'' (Circular Line), in which the artist broke away from the work in relief.

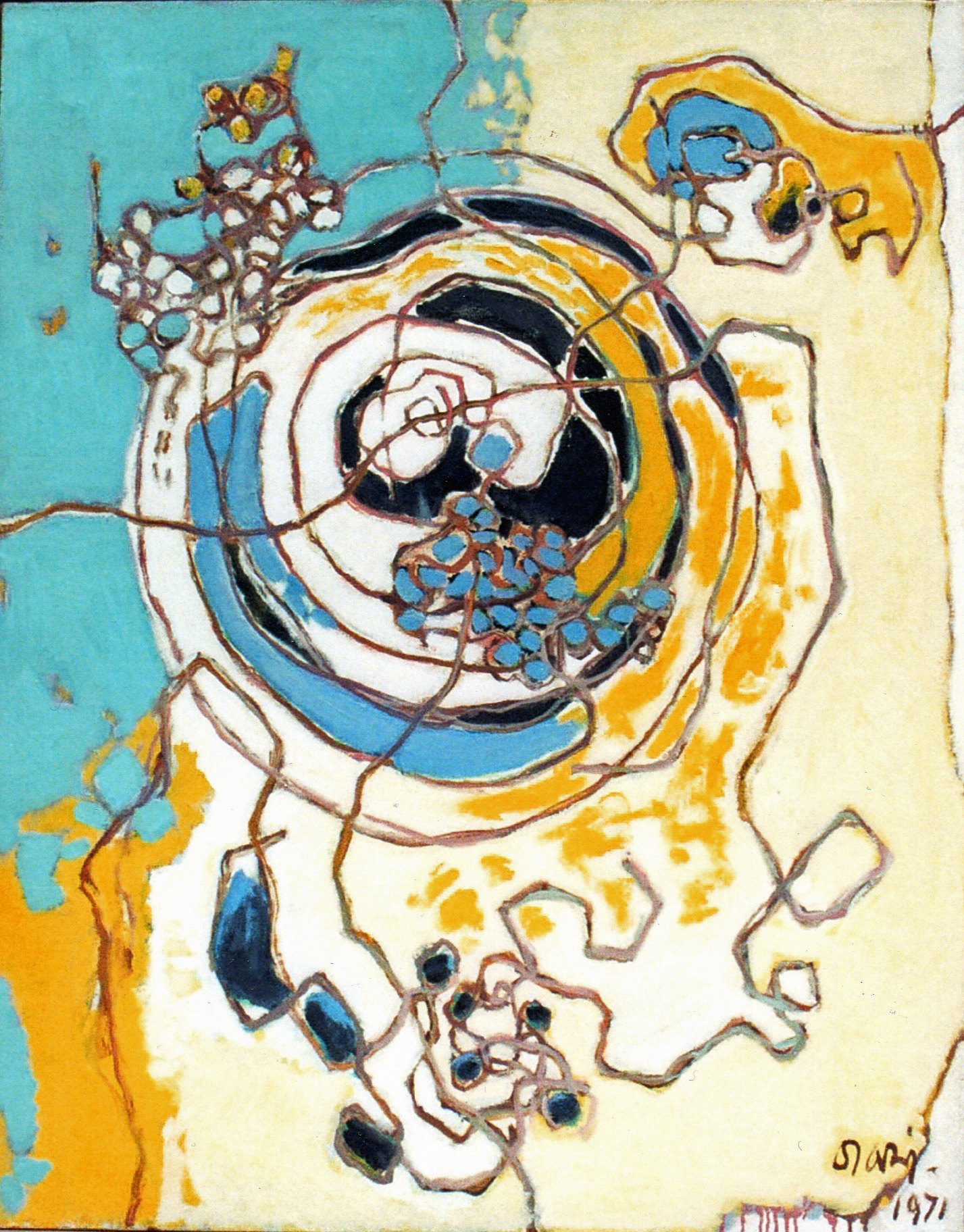
ORAZI' Nebula on a turquoise background,1971

ORAZI was also a writer. In 1974, his tale - written at the beginning of the 70s - was published in Paris.
