= Juana Muller =

Chilean sculptor (1911–1952)

- Born: Juana Müller Goldmann; 11 February 1911; Santiago, Chile
- Died: 4 March 1952 (aged 41); Paris, France
- Education: School of Fine Arts of Santiago, 1933
- Spouse: Jean Le Moal (m. 1944)

Signature
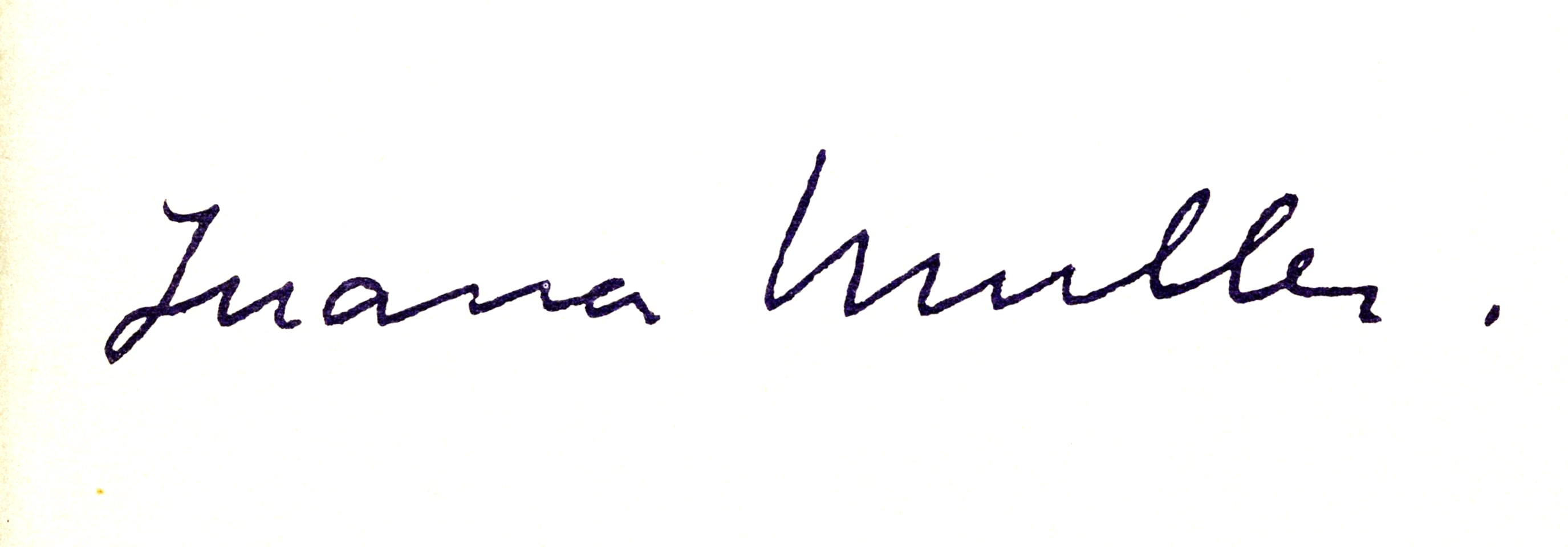

Juana Müller Goldmann (12 February 1911 – 4 March 1952), known as Juana Muller or Juana Müller, was a Chilean sculptor.

== Early life and education ==
Juana Müller Goldmann was born on 12 February 1911 in Santiago to German immigrant parents.

From 1930 to 1933 Muller studied under Julio Antonio Vásquez and Lorenzo Domínguez at the School of Fine Arts of Santiago.

== Career ==
=== Paris ===
In 1937, Muller received a scholarship which allowed her to go to Paris. In Paris, Muller joined Ossip Zadkine's studio at the Académie de la Grande Chaumière. During this period Muller frequented the Académie Ranson where she met her future husband Jean Le Moal.

In 1939, Muller met Constantin Brâncuși and later joined Brâncuși's studio on the Impasse Ronsin. Muller helped introduce other Chilean sculptors into Parisian artistic circles, and is known to have introduced Lily Garafulic to Brâncuși.

=== Post-war Paris ===
From 1945 onward, Muller's work shifted from the figurative towards the abstract. Muller became part of the New School of Paris. Pinto exhibited at the Jeanne Bucher, Folklore, Salon de Mai (May Salon) and the Salon de la jeune sculpture (Young Sculpture Salon).

In 1952 Muller exhibited alongside Étienne Martin, François Stahly and Marie-Thérèse Pinto in a group exhibition at the galerie MAI (Meubles Architectures Installations) in Paris.

== Personal life ==
In 1944, Muller married Jean Le Moal.

On 4 March 1952 Muller died in Paris aged 41.
