= André Marchand =

André Marchand may refer to:

- André Marchand (painter) (1907–1997), French painter
- André Marchand (politician) (1926–2011), Canadian politician
