= Luis Miguel Valdés Morales =

- Born: 1949 (age 76–77); Cuba
- Education: Escuela Nacional de Arte (ENA), Instituto Superior de Arte (ISA)
- Organizations: Founder, La Siempre Habana
- Known for: Painting, engraving, sculpture, teaching
- Notable work: Ella también fue (2015)
- Style: Contemporary Cuban art, printmaking
- Movement: Cuban modernism
- Awards: UNEAC National Salon Prize, Milan Lithography Prize, Salon de Mai (Paris)
- Website: luismiguelvaldes.com

Luis Miguel Valdés Morales (born 1949) is a Cuban painter, printmaker, sculptor, and educator known for his contributions to contemporary Cuban visual art and the promotion of engraving techniques internationally. He has exhibited widely in Latin America, Europe, and the United States, and founded a Cuban-Mexican cultural project, La Siempre Habana.

== Early life and education ==
Valdés was born in Havana, Cuba, and studied at the Escuela Nacional de Arte (ENA), graduating in 1969 with a focus on painting, drawing, and printmaking. He continued his studies at the Instituto Superior de Arte (ISA), where he later became a professor and head of the engraving department. In 1986, he received a scholarship to study at Atelier 17 in Paris, founded by Stanley William Hayter, which influenced his experimental approach to engraving and print media.

== Academic and artistic career ==
From 1969 to 1991, Valdés taught at ISA, where he trained several generations of Cuban artists in traditional and experimental engraving techniques. He participated in and won prizes at multiple National Salons of the Unión de Escritores y Artistas de Cuba (UNEAC), as well as international recognitions, such as the Lithography Prize in Milan and a collective award at the Salon de Mai in Paris.

In 1991, he moved to Mexico, where he continued his work as an artist and cultural promoter. In 1995, he founded La Siempre Habana, a workshop and gallery dedicated to promoting Cuban and Mexican art and facilitating cultural exchange.

== Work and themes ==
Valdés’s work spans painting, engraving, sculpture, drawing, and installation. His compositions often explore the female figure, Afro-Cuban identity, and layered textures. His techniques integrate traditional printmaking with contemporary digital tools.

One of his notable pieces is Ella también fue (2015), an acrylic on canvas painting that evokes memory and identity through stylized figuration.

== Exhibitions and recognition ==
Valdés’s works have been exhibited at institutions and galleries in Cuba, Mexico, Germany, Spain, the United States, and other countries. His art appears in public and private collections, including the National Museum of Fine Arts of Cuba and other international institutions.

In Mexico, he has collaborated with numerous artists and helped introduce Cuban engraving to new audiences.

== See also ==
- Paintings by Luis Miguel Valdés Morales
