= Iris XVI =

Chestnut racehorse of the French army

Iris XVI was a chestnut racehorse belonging to the French army, executed by German soldiers on June 14, 1940, for the act of resisting.

== History ==
The horse was admitted to Saint-Cyr in 1936. The captain Philippe Leclerc de Hauteclocque (the future Marshal Leclerc), then instructor at Saint-Cyr, participated in the military training of Iris XVI. Renowned for his difficult character, Iris XVI did not fail to disconcert his riders. Captain Philippe Leclerc de Hauteclocque owed his limp and cane to a fall from Iris XVI's back, resulting in a fractured tibia, with lifelong sequelae. This part of the history of Iris XVI remains unverifiable, due to its age.

Iris XVI had become an excellent racehorse, particularly in the steeple-chase on Maisons-Laffitte racecourses. He was not ridden in the race by captain Philippe Leclerc de Hauteclocque because he was too tall and heavy. When captain Philippe Leclerc de Hauteclocque was deployed to Africa, the horse continued his racing career with Captain Jean Fanneau de La Horie, with whom he gained notoriety in Nazi Germany. Iris XVI was not mobilized during the Second World War, because of his notoriety or unsuitability.

=== Act of resistance ===
On June 14, 1940, Saint-Cyr was captured by the Germans. One of the German commanders asked to see the horse that had beaten him in a past race, one of his soldiers went to look for him. Iris XVI gave the soldier a violent blow with his hoof. The German soldier died instantly. Iris XVI was executed a few moments later for an act of resistance.

Marshal Leclerc de Hautecloque is said to have commented on the case by stating "He was as patriotic as his master."

== Description ==
Iris XVI is described as a chestnut or roan horse, very lively, with a bad character. There is only one portrait by André Marchand representing him in the Grande carrière de Saint-Cyr, kept by Marshal Leclerc's family. The horse carries three stockings and an extended stripe on his face.
