= Jean Le Moal =

French painter (1909–2007)

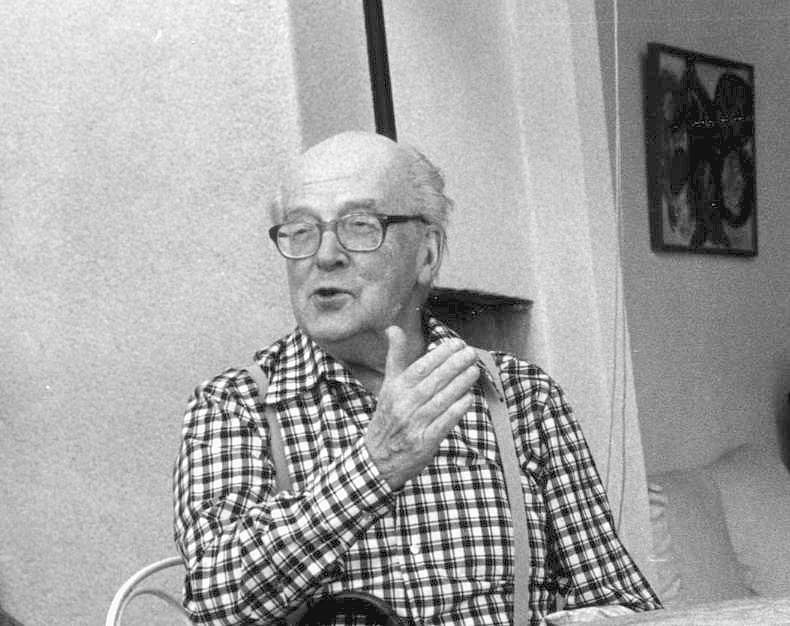
- Le Moal in 1985
- Born: 30 October 1909; Authon-du-Perche, France
- Died: 16 March 2007 (aged 97); Chilly-Mazarin, France
- Education: Ecole des Beaux-Arts de Lyon; École nationale supérieure des arts décoratifs Académie Ranson, 1936
- Occupations: Painter; set designer
- Spouse: Juana Muller (m. 1944; died 1952)

Signature
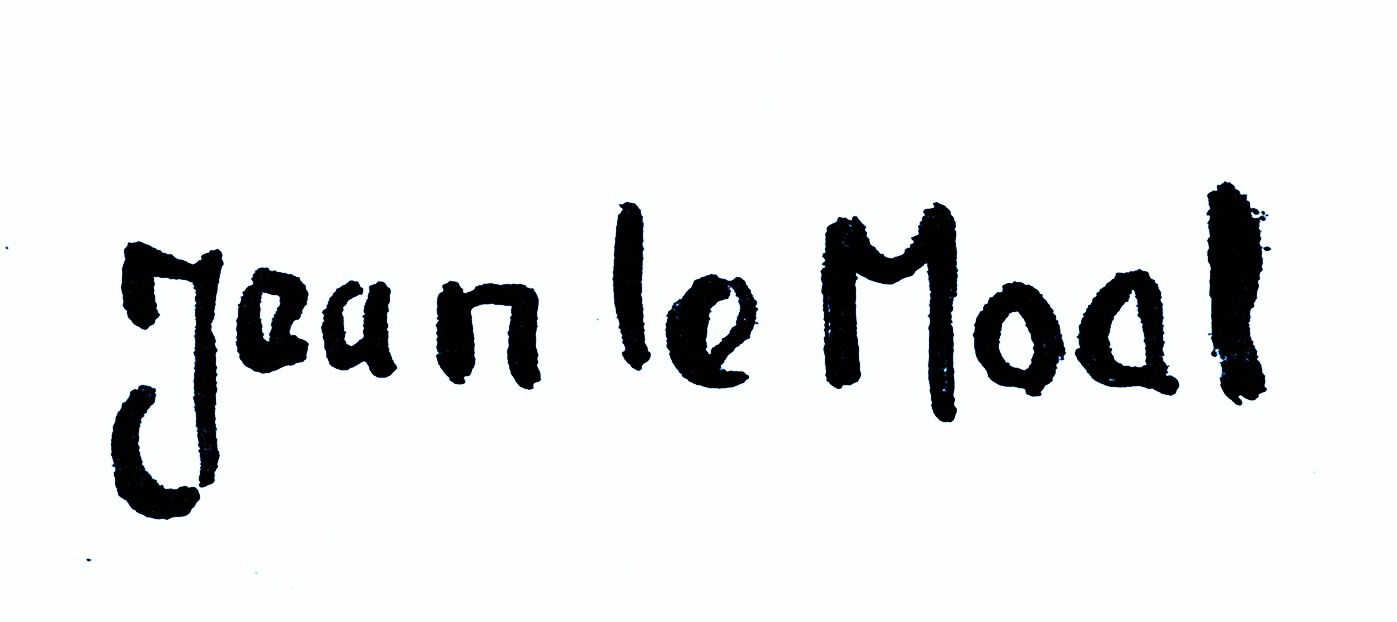

Jean Le Moal (30 October 1909 – 16 March 2007) was a French painter and set designer. A member of the New School of Paris, Le Moal was a founding member of the Salon de Mai.

== Biography ==
Le Moal was born on 30 October 1909 in Authon-du-Perche. Le Moal enrolled at the "Ecole des Beaux-Arts de Lyon" in 1926, and the École nationale supérieure des arts décoratifs in Paris in 1929. He also attended the "Académie Ranson" (1935–1936).

In 1939, Le Moal worked on the 1400 square meter ceiling of the French Pavilion at the International Exhibition in New York.

In 1941, Le Moal exhibited in "XX jeunes peintres de tradition française", with Bazaine, Manessier, Singier, Pignon, Gischia, and in 1943 in "Douze peintres d’aujourd’hui" at Galerie de France. In 1945, he was a founding member of the Salon de Mai.

In the post-war years Jean Le Moal became established as a prominent figure in European painting. He exhibited throughout Europe and was also awarded the "Prix de la Critique" in 1953.

Several retrospectives have been dedicated to Le Moal's work, including at Musée de Lubeck and Musée de Wuppertal (1961), Musée de Metz and Musée de la Ville de Luxembourg (1963), Musées de Rennes, Chartres, Rouen, Dijon, Lille and Caen (1970–1971), "Espace lyonnais d'art contemporain" and Musées de Besançon, Esch-sur-Alzette, Dunkerque and Nantes (1990–1992).

Le Moal's work is represented in many museums including

- Musée National d’Art Moderne, Paris
- Tate Modern, London
- Museum of Modern Art, Wellington, New Zealand
- Museo de Arte Moderno, Mexico,
- Modern Art Museum of Luxembourg
- Onstad Museum, Norway
- Museo de Arte, Chile
- Musée d’Art Contemporain, Yugoslavia
- Musée de Turin, Italy.

== Personal life ==
In 1944 Le Moal married Juana Muller, a Chilean sculptor and member of the New School of Paris.

On 16 March 2007 Le Moal died in Chilly-Mazarin, aged 97.

== Selective bibliography ==
- (in French) Trois peintres. Le Moal, Manessier, Singier, (Camille Bourniquel), Galerie Drouin, Paris, 1946.
- (in French) Camille Bourniquel, Jean Le Moal, Le Musée de Poche, Éditions Georges Fall, Paris, 1960.
- (in French) Le Moal, (Bernard Dorival), Musées de Metz and Musée d'État, Luxembourg 1963.
- (in French) Jean Le Moal, (Gaston Diehl, Maurice Jacquemont, Michel-Georges Bernard), Musées de Rennes, Chartres, Rouen, Dijon, Lille and Caen, 1970 and 1971.
- (in French) Le Moal, (Jean Guichard-Meili), Galerie de France, Paris, 1974.
- (in French) Jean Le Moal, (Thierry Raspail, Odile Plassard, Jean-Jacques Lerrant, Michel-Georges Bernard), Espace lyonnais d'art contemporain, Lyon, Musée des Beaux-Arts et d'archéologie, Besançon, Galerie-Maison de la culture, Esch-sur-Alzette (Luxembourg), Musée d'art contemporain, Dunkerque and Château des ducs de Bretagne, Nantes, 1990–1992
- (in French) Jean Le Moal, (Francis Villadier, Alin Avila, Michel-Georges Bernard), Musée d'art et d'histoire, Meudon, 1997.
- (in French) Michel-Georges Bernard, Jean Le Moal, Éditions Ides et Calendes, Neuchâtel, 2001 (208 p.).
- (in French) Jean Le Moal, Un chemin de lumière, De chapelles en cathédrales, l'œuvre-vitrail, Musée Pierre-Noël, Saint-Dié-des-Vosges, 2008 (48 p.).

== See also ==
- Lyrical Abstraction
