= Paul-Félix Beuvain de Beauséjour =

French Catholic bishop (d. 1930)

- Bishop of Diocese of Carcassonne and Narbonne

Orders
- Consecration: 1902

Personal details
- Born: 16 December 1839 Vesoul, France
- Died: 4 April 1930 (aged 90) Carcassonne, France
- Denomination: Catholic Church

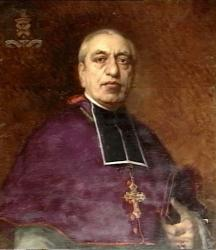

Paul-Félix Beuvain de Beauséjour (born 16 December 1839 in Vesoul – 4 April 1930) was a French Catholic clergyman and bishop of the Diocese of Carcassonne-Narbonne. His father Louis-Ernst (1811–1859) was a lawyer by profession and his mother Eugénie, née Fyard de Mercey (1813–1907), was a housewife. He had four siblings. He studied at Saint-Sulpice and was ordained a priest on 6 January 1863, serving as a teacher. He was appointed bishop in 1902. He died on 4 April 1930, at the age of 90.
