= Bruno Valentin =

French prelate

- Bishop of Carcassonne and Narbonne
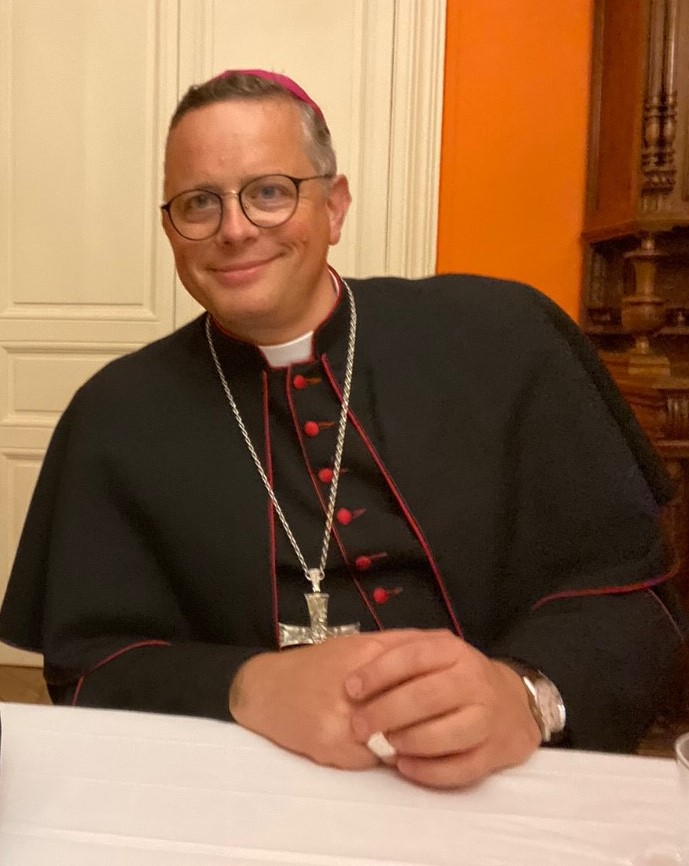
- Valentin in 2019
- Church: Catholic Church
- Diocese: Diocese of Carcassonne and Narbonne
- Appointed: 31 March 2023
- Predecessor: Alain Planet
- Previous posts: Coadjutor Bishop of Carcassonne and Narbonne (2022-2023); Titular Bishop of Vaison (2018-2022); Auxiliary Bishop of Versailles (2018-2022)

Orders
- Ordination: 29 June 2000 by Jean-Charles Thomas
- Consecration: 20 January 2019 by Éric Aumonier

Personal details
- Born: Bruno Paul Marie Valentin; 22 January 1972 (age 54) Nancy, Meurthe-et-Moselle, France
- Coat of arms

Bruno Valentin (born 22 January 1972) is a French prelate of the Catholic Church who became bishop Carcassonne-Narbonne on 31 March 2023 after serving as coadjutor there for eight months. He was auxiliary bishop of Versailles from 2019 to 2022.

== Biography ==
Bruno Paul Marie Valentin was born on 22 January 1972 in Nancy. After his secondary studies, he obtained a licentiate in economics from the Paris IV-Dauphine University and then entered the Versailles Seminary. In 1995 he moved to the Pontifical French Seminary in Rome and earned a degree in theology with a specialization in ecclesiology at the Pontifical Gregorian University in 2001. He was ordained a priest of the Diocese of Versailles on 29 June 2000.

He was parish vicar of Trappes and diocesan delegate for the pastoral care of young adults from 2001 to 2004; pastor of Chatou from 2004 to 2012; head of the diocesan service for formation from 2007 to 2012; dean of Le Vésinet from 2007 to 2010; pastor of Montigny and Voisins-le-Bretonneux, episcopal vicar of the deanery of Rambouillet, and a member of the episcopal council from 2012 to 2018; episcopal vicar of the deanery of Maule-Montfort-Houdan from 2013 to 2018; diocesan delegate of the Œuvre des Campagnes from 2014 to 2018; and episcopal vicar of the deanery of Saint-Quentin from 2015 to 2018.

On 14 December 2018, Pope Francis appointed him titular bishop of Vaison and auxiliary bishop of Versailles. He received his episcopal ordination on 20 January 2019 from Jean-Charles Thomas, Bishop of Versailles. He became vicar general of the Diocese of Versailles, and within the French Episcopal Conference he was a member of the council for the Universal Mission of the Church. Upon the retirement of Éric Aumonier as bishop of Versailles on 17 December 2020, the college of consultors of the diocese elected Valentin the next day to serve as apostolic administrator until the installation of a new bishop on 11 April 2021.

On 15 July 2022, he was named bishop coadjutor of the Diocese of Carcassonne-Narbonne. He became bishop there when Pope Francis accepted his predecessor's resignation on 31 March 2023.
