= Roger Chastel =

French painter

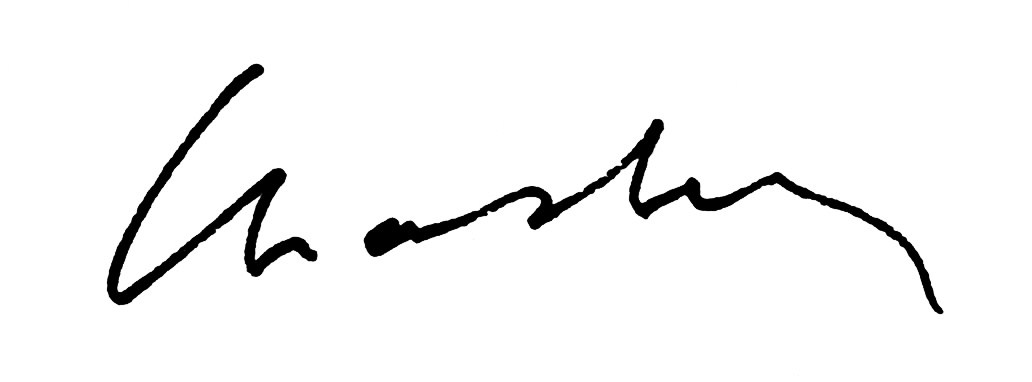
Roger Chastel signature

Roger Chastel (Édouard Henri Roger Chastel; 25 March 1897 in Paris – 12 July 1981 in Saint-Germain-en-Laye.) was a French painter from l'École de Paris with their work inside le limit of abstract art.

== See also ==
- Ouanes Amor
