= Henri-Marie-Gaston Boisnormand de Bonnechose =

Catholic cardinal

His Eminence Henri-Marie-Gaston Boisnormand de Bonnechose
- Archbishop of Rouen
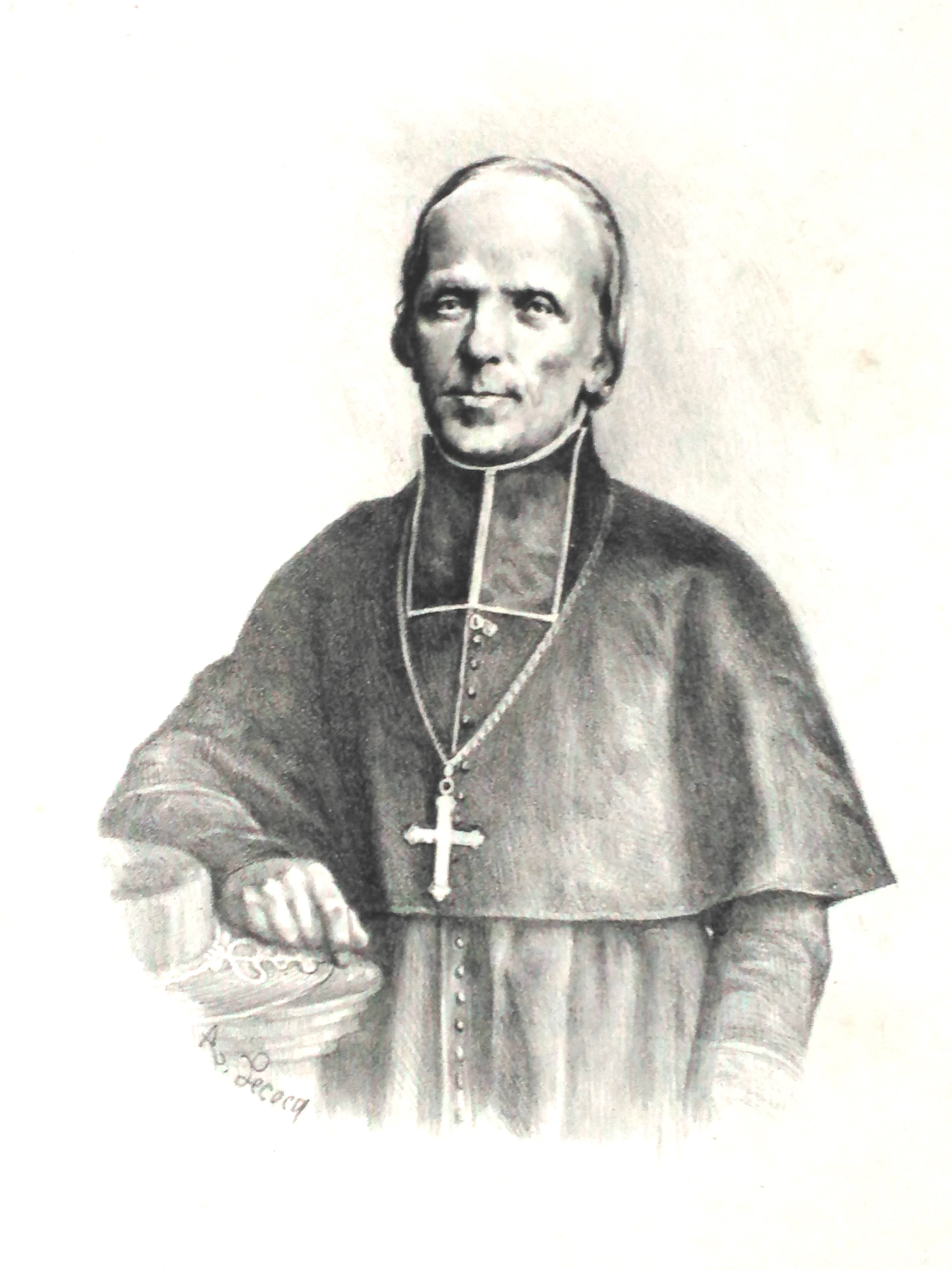
- Church: Roman Catholic Church
- Archdiocese: Rouen
- See: Rouen
- Appointed: 18 March 1858
- Term ended: 28 October 1883
- Predecessor: Louis-Marie-Edmont Blanquart de Bailleul
- Successor: Léon-Benoît-Charles Thomas
- Other post: Cardinal-Priest of San Clemente (1864-83)
- Previous posts: Bishop of Carcassonne (1848-55); Bishop of Évreux (1855-58)

Orders
- Ordination: 21 December 1833 by Jean-François-Marie Le Pappe de Trévern
- Consecration: 30 January 1848 by Antonio Francesco Orioli
- Created cardinal: 11 December 1863 by Pope Pius IX
- Rank: Cardinal-Priest

Personal details
- Born: Henri-Marie-Gaston Boisnormand de Bonnechose; 30 May 1800 Paris, French First Republic
- Died: 28 October 1883 (aged 83) Rouen, French Third Republic
- Buried: Rouen Cathedral
- Parents: Louis Gaston Boisnormand de Bonnechose; Sara Maria Schas
- Motto: Fide ac virtute
- Coat of arms

Henri-Marie-Gaston Boisnormand de Bonnechose (French pronunciation: [ɑ̃ʁi maʁi ɡastɔ̃ bwanɔʁmɑ̃ də bɔnʃoz]; 30 May 1800 – 28 October 1883) was a French Catholic and senator. He was the last surviving cardinal to have been born in the 18th century.

== Biography ==
Bonnechose was born in Paris. Entering the magistracy, he became attorney-general for the district of Besançon in 1830, but having received holy orders at Strasburg, under the episcopate of Johann Franz Lepape von Trevern, he was made professor of sacred eloquence in the school of higher studies founded at Besançon by Cardinal de Rohan.

After the death of de Rohan, he went to Rome to settle the differences between Bishop de Trevern and himself, due to philosophical opinions found in his work, "Philosophy of Christianity", for which Bonnechose had written an introduction. In 1844 he was named by Rome superior of the French community of St. Louis. In 1847 he became Bishop of Carcassonne. He was transferred on 4 November 1854 to the see of Évreux and in 1854 raised to the archiepiscopal see of Rouen.

Created cardinal in 1863, he became ex-officio senator of the empire. The cardinal showed himself a warm advocate of the temporal power of the popes, and firmly protested against the withdrawal of the French army from the Pontifical States.

In 1870, he went to Versailles, the headquarters of the German armies, to entreat Wilhelm I of Prussia to reduce the war contribution imposed on the city of Rouen. Under the republican government he uniformly opposed the laws and measures passed against religious congregations and their schools, but endeavored to inspire his clergy to deference and conciliation in their relations with the civil authorities.

His best known work is "Introduction a la philosophie du Christianisme" (1835), two octavo volumes.
