= Diocese of Carcassonne-Narbonne =

Latin Catholic diocese in France

Diocese of Carcassonne and Narbonne Dioecesis Carcassonensis et Narbonensis Diocèse de Carcassonne et Narbonne

Catholic
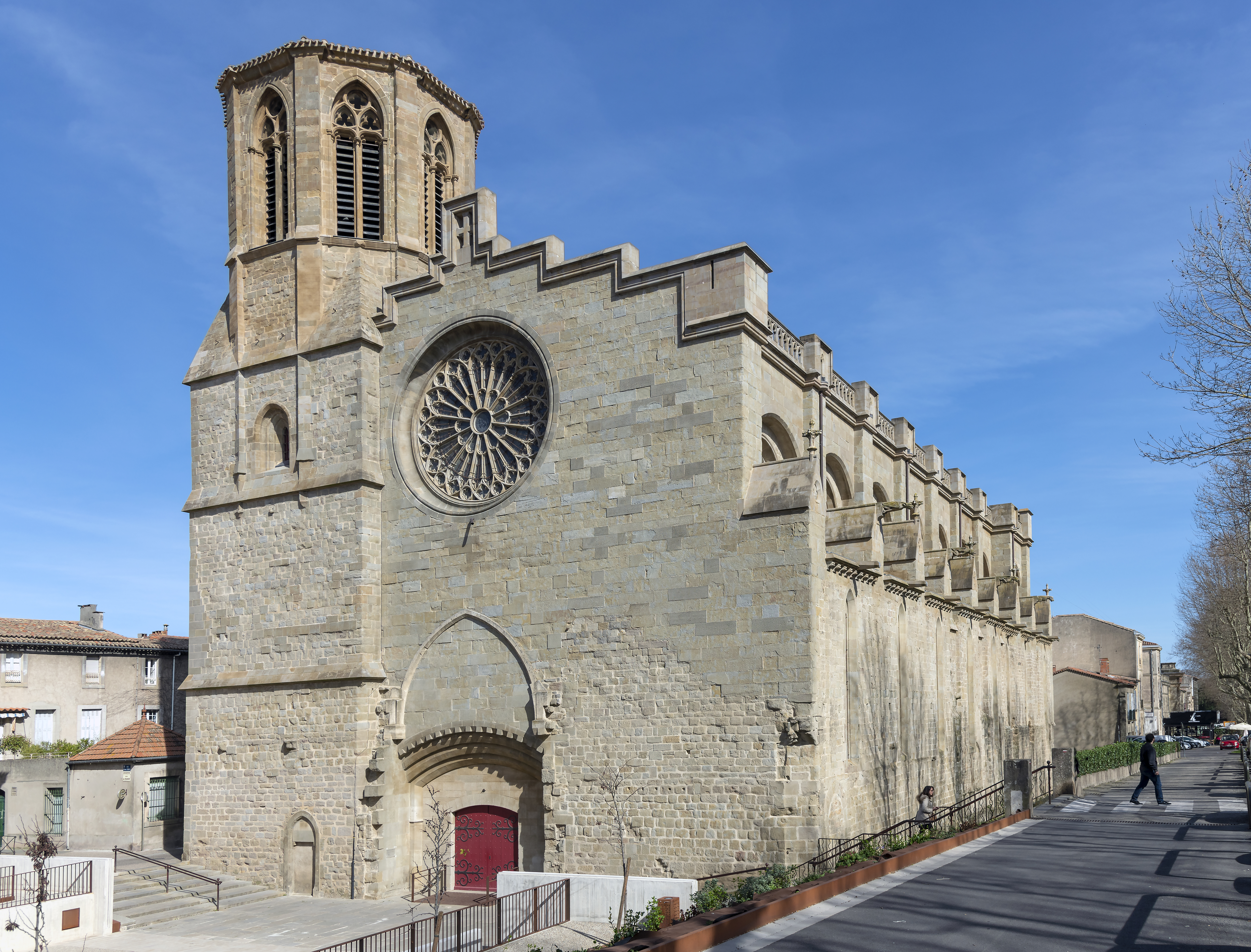
- Carcassonne Cathedral

Location
- Country: France
- Ecclesiastical province: Montpellier
- Metropolitan: Archdiocese of Montpellier
- Coordinates: 43°12′56″N 2°21′10″E

Statistics
- Area: 6,313 km^{2} (2,437 sq mi)
- Population: Total; Catholics: (as of 2023); 375,806 ▼; 229,000 (est.) ▼
- Parishes: 325

Information
- Denomination: Catholic Church
- Sui iuris church: Latin Church
- Rite: Roman Rite
- Established: 6th cent. (renamed as Diocese of Carcassonne et Narbonne: 14 June 2006)
- Cathedral: Cathedral of St. Michael in Carcassonne
- Patron saint: St. Nazarius and St. Celsus; St. Michael the Archangel
- Secular priests: 50 (Diocesan) ▼46 (Religious Orders) ▲9 Permanent Deacons

Current leadership
- Pope: Leo XIV
- Bishop: Bruno Valentin
- Metropolitan Archbishop: Norbert Turini
- Bishops emeritus: Jacques Despierre; Alain Planet

Map

Website
- Website of the Diocese

The Diocese of Carcassonne and Narbonne (Latin: Dioecesis Carcassonensis et Narbonensis; French: Diocèse de Carcassonne et Narbonne) is a Latin Church ecclesiastical jurisdiction or diocese of the Catholic Church in France. The diocese comprises the entire department of Aude. It is suffragan to the Archdiocese of Montpellier.

On the occasion of the Concordat of 1802, the former Diocese of Carcassonne, nearly all the old Archdiocese of Narbonne, almost the entire Diocese of Saint-Papoul, a part of the ancient Diocese of Alet and ancient Diocese of Mirepoix, and the former Diocese of Perpignan, were united to make the one Diocese of Carcassonne. In 1822 the Diocese of Perpignan was re-established.

In 2006 the diocese of Carcassonne was renamed the Diocese of Carcassonne and Narbonne.

== History ==
Carcassonne was founded by the Visigoths (the Volcaii Tectosages), who sought to compensate themselves for the loss of Lodève and Uzès by having Carcassonne made an episcopal see. The first of its bishops known to history was Sergius (589) and an Archdeacon of Carcassonne, Donnel, is recorded as having subscribed to the acts of the 4th Council of Toledo in 633. In 759, Pepin the Short conquered Septimania from the Muslims and united it, Carcassonne included, to the Frankish crown.

The churches of Nôtre-Dame de Canabès and Nôtre-Dame de Limoux, both of which date back to the ninth century, are still visited by pilgrims.

Peter of Castelnau, the Cistercian inquisitor, was murdered in January 1208, perhaps on order of Raymond VI, Count of Toulouse. St. John Francis Regis (1597–1640), the Jesuit, born at Fontcouverte, Aude, in the Diocese of Narbonne, is honored in the present Diocese of Carcassonne.

=== Chapter and cathedral ===
The date of the foundation of the first cathedral is unknown. The Cathedral of Saints-Nazaire-et-Celse at Carcassonne was rebuilt toward the end of the eleventh century, the first work upon it being blessed by Pope Urban II, who had come to Carcassonne in 1088 to urge the Viscount Bernard Ato IV de Trincavel to join the Crusade.

In that year the cathedral Chapter was already in existence and its canons followed the Rule of Saint Augustine. The Chapter had existed for a considerable time, perhaps going back to Bishop Gimerius in the tenth century, but papal sanction confirmed and strengthened its position as a corporate body living under a Rule. On 26 May 1095, Pope Urban addressed a letter to Bishop Pierre, confirming the institution of Clercs Regular of Saint Augustine in the Chapter of the Cathedral and two other churches in the diocese of Carcassonne. The approbation of Urban II was confirmed by Pope Anastasius IV on 5 April 1154. On 11 June 1096, Pope Urban II arrived in Carcassonne from Toulouse, where he spent five days, celebrating a pontifical Mass in the unfinished cathedral.

The Chapter included as officers the two Archdeacons, two archpriests, a Sacristan, a Precentor, a Chamberlain, an Eleemosynary, and a master of the works. On 28 January 1227, Pope Gregory IX issued a bull in which he took the Prior and canons and cathedral of Saint-Nazaire under papal protection, along with all the churches which belonged to it, which are listed. In 1439, the canons were secularized by Pope Eugenius IV, and the Chapter came to have as officers a Dean, the Archdeacon, a Precentor, and a Sacristan. There were thirty Canons, each with a prebend, and they received a new set of Statutes. In 1660, there were four dignities and sixteen canons. In 1730, there were three dignities and twelve canons.

There was a collegiate church dedicated to Saint-Vincent at Montréal, established by Pope John XXII in 1317. It was administered by fifteen canons, among whom were three dignities (Dean, Sacristan, and Precentor). The Deanship was elective, but the bishop of Carcassonne had to be summoned to the electoral meeting, and he had the first vote as well as the right to confirm or decline the dean-elect.

Since the Synod of 2007, the diocese has been reorganized into fourteen 'new parishes'.

=== Albigensians ===
The history of the region of Carcassonne is intimately connected with that of the Albigenses. Notre-Dame-de-Prouille Monastery, where the Spaniard Dominic de Guzman established a religious institute for converted Albigensian women in 1206, is still a place of pilgrimage.

In 1206 or 1207, the Abbot Guy of Vaux de Cernay (Paris) began a preaching tour of the province of Narbonne, from which he returned to France in 1208, to help launch a crusade against the heretics of Languedoc. He was back in Languedoc in 1209, as a friend and councilor of Simon de Montfort. In 1209, the people of Carcassonne, faced with the approaching forces of the Albigensian Crusade, destroyed the stalls of the canons in the cathedra, as well as the refectory and cellars of the quarters of the canons, from which they reinforced the city walls. Vicomte Raymond Roger of Carcassonne died in prison, attended in his last hours by Bishop Bernard-Raimond de Roquefort, on 10 November 1209.

In July 1210, a massacre of Albigensians was perpetrated at a place called Minerva, under the superrvision of Simon de Montfort and Abbot Gy de Vaux, in which 140 men and women were burnt alive, after having refused Abbot Guy's exhortations to reject their heresy.

On 15 April 1211, Pope Innocent III, who was a firm supporter of the crusade and of Simon de Montfort, wrote to hi papal legate, Bishop Raymond of Uzès, to accept the resignation of the bishop of Carcassonne, Bishop Bernard-Raimond, and to absolve him from pontifical responsibilities. Within eight days, with the legate's assistance, a suitable successor was to be found; a second letter was directed to the Chapter of Carcassone, ordering them to elect a person who was suitable for the honor and burden (oneri et honore). In the same year, Abbot Guy de Vaux de Cernay was named bishop of Carcassonne, with the support of Simon de Montfort. He was still bishop-elect in June and July 1211, when he participated in the siege of Toulouse. His consecration, along with that of Arnaud de Cîteaux, archbishop-elect of Narbonne, took place after 12 March 1212, but before the council of Narbonne on 30 April 1212, summoned by Archbishop Arnaud and attended by Bishop Guy. In February 1213, Bishop Guy de Vaux set off for Paris to secure additional support for the crusading forces; he left his diocese in the care of Dominic de Guzman as his vicar-general.

Simon de Montfort, Lord of Montfort (1188), Earl of Leicester (1204), Viscount of Albi, Béziers and Carcassonne (1213), and Count of Toulouse (1215), died on 26 June 1218 and was buried in the cathedral of Carcassonne.

In 1229, the Inquisition was formally established in Carcassonne, and on 22 April 1232 (i.e. 1233) Pope Gregory IX assigned the Dominicans to staff it.

On June 1245, at the First Council of Lyon, Pope Innocent IV ordered six bishops including Bishop Clarus of Carcassonne to continue the operation of the Inquisition in their dioceses.

In 1247, Count Raymond II Trencavel of Carcassonne surrendered to King Louis IX of France, and the County of Carcassonne became part of the French kingdom.

In 1270, Bishop Bernard de Capendu (1265–1278) held a synod and issued constitutions. Bishop Pierre de Roquefort (1300–1321) held a diocesan synod in 1309, and issued a set of statutes.

=== Episcopal elections and appointments of 1456 ===
Following the death of Bishop Jean d'Étampes on 25 January 1456, the Chapter of the cathedral of Carcassonne met, on 3 February, to set a date for the election of the next bishop and to elect a vicar general for the period of the sede vacante. They chose instead two co-vicars, the Archdeacon-major Bartholomaeus Alqueri and the Precentor Dominique de Furcata. On 14 February, the thirteen participants unanimously chose a fellow canon, the subdeacon Geoffroy de Basilhac. Since the elected had taken place by the Via inspirationis Spiritus Sancti, and since there was uncertainty as to whether the bishop-elect was of the minimal canonical age, the Chapter sent a delegation to Pope Calixtus III to seek confirmation of the election. The pope replied in a decree of 25 June 1456, voiding the election.

On 25 June the pope also appointed to the vacant diocese of Carcassonne the Bishop of Nîmes, Jean du Chastel, who was a nephew of Cardinal Alain de Coëtivy, a brother of Tanneguy de Chastel, Constable of France, and also a canon of the cathedral Chapter. Refusing to be deterred from their original intention, or their electoral rights, the Chapter held another election on 21 July 1256, and again elected Geoffroy de Basilhac, this time by voting viva voce. Geoffroy was immediately conducted to the cathedral and enthroned in the episcopal seat, and his election was proclaimed to the clergy and people by the senior canon. Application was made to the metropolitan archbishop of Narbonne, and, in his absence, the Vicar-General, Raoul Bouvier, who issued letters on 14 August 1456 to Bishop Guillaume d'Estampes of Condom, a canon of Carcassonne; to Canon Jean du Chastel; and to Canon Pierre de Trillia; they were ordered to appear in Narbonne on 15 September to explain their reasons for opposing the election.

On 6 April 1457, Cardinal de Coëtivy, papal legate in Avignon, named Bishop-elect Jean de Chastel of Carcassonne abbot commendatory of Saint-Léonard de Ferrières in Poitou. Surviving documents from Carcassonne indicate only that Jean du Chastel was recognized by the Chapter of Carcassonne by 8 December 1459. He did not make his formal entry into his diocese until 13 May 1464. He died in Toulouse on 15 September 1475.

Geoffroy de Basilhac was never recognized by Calixtus III, or by his successor Pius II, as bishop of Carcassonne, despite extensive litigation both in France and in Rome. On 30 April 1262, Pius II named him bishop of Rieux, but he is referred to as bishop-elect of Carcassone in the documents referring to the appointment. He died in March 1480.

=== Educational establishments ===
There was already a collège (high school) in Carcassonne in the 16th century, financed and housed by the municipal government, but its administration and staffing was haphazard. By the beginning of the 17th century, it was recognized that something better was needed. In 1605 and 1610, discussions took place, and finally the matter was submitted to King Henry IV. In April 1610, the king issued letters patent in favor of the establishment of a Jesuit collège in Carcassonne. By 1614, the method of financing it from various sources, including 1,000 livres Tournois per annum from the bishop of Carcassonne, was agreed upon. Forty-nine houses were acquired, and new construction was undertaken, and the chapel was finally consecrated in 1677. In 1764, following the expulsion of the Jesuits from France, King Louis XV handed over the collège to the Priests of Christian Doctrine, who adopted the methods of study of the University of Paris.

=== French Revolution ===
On 2 November 1789, the French National Assembly proclaimed that all ecclesiastical property in France was confiscated by the State.

Even before it directed its attention to the Church directly, the National Constituent Assembly attacked the institution of monasticism. On 13 February 1790. it issued a decree which stated that the government would no longer recognize solemn religious vows taken by either men or women. In consequence, Orders and Congregations which lived under a Rule were suppressed in France. Members of either sex were free to leave their monasteries or convents if they wished, and could claim an appropriate pension by applying to the local municipal authority.

The National Constituent Assembly ordered the replacement of political subdivisions of the ancien régime with subdivisions called "departments", to be characterized by a single administrative city in the center of a compact area. The decree was passed on 22 December 1789, and the boundaries fixed on 26 February 1790, with the effective date of 4 March 1790. A new department was created, called "Aude", and its administrative center was fixed at Carcassonne.

The National Constituent Assembly then, on 6 February 1790, instructed its ecclesiastical committee to prepare a plan for the reorganization of the clergy. At the end of May, its work was presented as a draft Civil Constitution of the Clergy, which, after vigorous debate, was approved on 12 July 1790. There was to be one diocese in each department, requiring the suppression of approximately fifty dioceses. The former diocese of Carcassonne became the diocese of Aude, with its seat at Narbonne. Ten new "metropolitanates" were created, and the diocese of Aude (formerly Carcassonne) was assigned to the Metropole du Sud, whose metropolitan was seated at Toulouse.

The Civil Constitution of the Clergy also abolished Chapters, canonries, prebends, and other offices both in cathedrals and in collegiate churches.

=== Restoration ===
The French Directory fell in the coup engineered by Talleyrand and Napoleon on 10 November 1799. The coup resulted in the establishment of the French Consulate, with Napoleon as the First Consul. To advance his aggressive military foreign policy, he decided to make peace with the Catholic Church in France and with the Papacy. In the concordat of 1801 with Pope Pius VII, and in the enabling papal bull, "Qui Christi Domini", the constitutional diocese of Aude and all the other dioceses in France, were suppressed. This removed all the institutional contaminations and novelties introduced by the Constitutional Church, and voided all of the episcopal appointments of both authentic and constitutional bishops. The diocesan structure was then canonically re-established by the papal bull "Qui Christi Domini" of 29 November 1801, including the diocese of Carcassonne, which was named a suffragan (subordinate) of Toulouse. The Concordat was registered as a French law on 8 April 1802.

From 1848 to 1855 the see was occupied by Bishop de Bonnechose, who was created a Cardinal by Pope Pius IX on 11 December 1863; From 1855 to 1873, the see was held by the mystical writer, François-Alexandre Roullet de La Bouillerie.

== Bishops ==
=== To 1000 ===
[ Hilarius c. 550 ]

- (589) – Sergius
- (633) – Solemnius
- (636) – Elpidius
- (653) – Sylvester
- (683) – Stephanus

[ (788?) – Hispicio ]

- (813) – Senior
- (860) – Eurus

[ (878) – Léger ]

- (883–897) – Gislerranus
- (902–931) – Guimera
- (933–934) – Abbo
- (934–952) – Gisandus
- (c. 965–977) – Franco
- (982–986) – Aimeric

=== 1000 to 1300 ===
- (1002–1020) – Adalbert
- (c. 1028) – Fulco
- (1031–1058) – Guifred
- (1072–1075) – Bernard
- (1077–1083) – Pierre Artaud
- (1083–1101) – Petrus (II)
- (1106–1107?) – Guillaume Bernardi
- (1107–1110) – Raimond (I)
- (1113–1130) – Arnaud de Girone
- (1131–1141) – Raimond de Sorèze
- (1142–1159) – Pons de Tresmals
- (1159–1166?) – Pons de Brugals
- (1170?–1201) – Othon
- (1201–1209) – Bérenger
- (1209–1231) – Bernard-Raimond de Roquefort
- (1212–1223) – Guy de Vaux-de-Cernay (contested)
- (1226–1248) – Clarínus
- (1248–1255) – Guillaume Arnaud
- (1256–1264) – Guillaume Rudolphe
- (1265–1278) – Bernard de Capendu
- (1278–1280) – Gauthier
- (1280) – Bérenger
- (c. 1286) – Isarn
- (1291–1298) – Pierre de La Chapelle-Taillefer
- (1298–1300) – Jean de Chevry

=== 1300 to 1500 ===
- (1300–1321) – Pierre de Roquefort
- (1322–1323) – Guillaume de Flavacourt
- (1323–1330) – Pierre Rodier
- (1330–1336) – Pierre Jean
- (1337–1346) – Gaucelmus de Jean
- (1347–1354) – Gilbert Jean
- (1354–1357) – Arnaud Aubert
- (1358–1361) – Geoffroi de Vayrols
- (1361) – Étienne Aubert
- (1362–1370) – Jean Fabri
- (1371) – Hugues de La Jugie
- (1372–1391) – Pierre de Saint-Martial
- (1391–1409) – Simon de Cramaud Administrator (Avignon Obedience)
- (1409–1412) – Pierre Aimerici, (Avignon Obedience)
- (1413–1420) – Géraud du Puy
- (1420–1445) – Geoffroi de Pompadour
- (1446–1456) – Jean d’Étampes
- [ (1456–1459) – Geoffroi de Basilhac ]
- (1456–1475) – Jean du Chastel
- (1476–1497) – Guichard d'Aubusson
- (1497–1501) – Cardinal Juan Lopez, Administrator

=== 1500 to 1800 ===
- (1497–1512) – Pierre d'Auxillon
- (1512–1516) – Hugues de Voisins
- (1516–1521) – Jean de Basilhac
- (1521–1545) – Martín de Saint-André
- (1546–1552) – Charles de Bourbon-Vendôme, Administrator
- (1556–1565) – François de Faucon
- (1565–1567) – Charles de Bourbon-Vendôme, Administrator
- (1567–1568) – Vitelli Vitelloti, Administrator
- (1569–1601) – Annibal de Ruccellai
- (1603–1621) – Christophe de L’Estang
- (1621–1652) – Vitalis de L'Estang
- (1653–1654) – François de Servien
- (1655–1679) – Louis de Nogaret de La Valette
- (1680) – Louis d'Anglure de Bourlemont
- (1681–1722) – Louis Joseph de Grignan
- (1722–1729) – Louis Joseph de Chateauneuf de Rochebonne
- (1730–1778) – Armand Bazin de Bezons
- (1778–1788) – Jean Auguste de Chastenet de Puységur
- (1789–1791) – François Marie Fortuné de Vintimille

Constitutional Church (schismatic)

- (1791–1801) – Guillaume Bésaucèle, Constitutional bishop
- (1801) – Louis Belmas, (Constitutional Bishop)

=== From 1802 ===
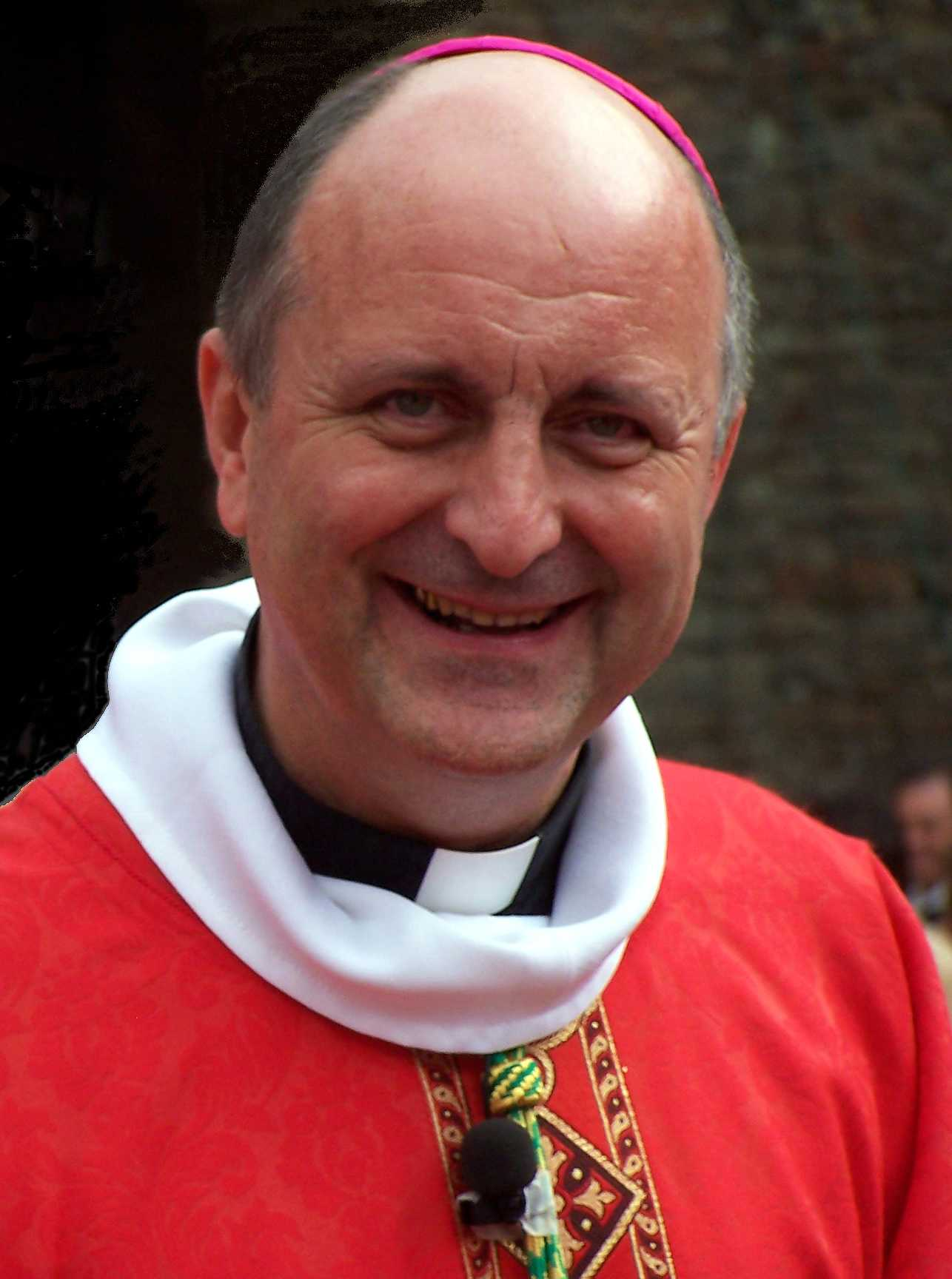
Bishop Alain-Emile Baptiste Planet

- (1802–1824) – Arnaud-Ferdinand de La Porte
- (1824–1847) – Joseph-Julien de Saint-Rome Gualy
- (1848–1855) – Henri-Marie-Gaston de Bonnechose
- (1855–1873) – François-Alexandre Roullet de La Bouillerie
- (1873–1881) – François-Albert Leuillieux
- (1881–1901) – Paul-Félix Arsène Billard
- (1902–1930) – Paul-Félix Beuvain de Beauséjour
- (1930–1931) – Emmanuel Coste
- (1932–1951) – Jean-Joseph Pays
- (1952–1982) – Pierre-Marie Joseph Puech
- (1982–2004) – Jacques Despierre
- (2004–2023) – Alain Planet
- (2023–pres.) – Bruno Valentin

== See also ==
- Ancient Diocese of Narbonne
- Catholic Church in France
- List of Catholic dioceses in France

== Bibliography ==
=== Reference works ===
- Gams, Pius Bonifatius (1873). Series episcoporum Ecclesiae catholicae: quotquot innotuerunt a beato Petro apostolo. Ratisbon: Typis et Sumptibus Georgii Josephi Manz. pp. 528–529. (Use with caution; obsolete)
- Eubel, Conradus, ed. (1913). Hierarchia catholica (in Latin). Vol. 1 (second ed.). Münster: Libreria Regensbergiana.
- Eubel, Conradus, ed. (1914). Hierarchia catholica (in Latin). Vol. 2 (second ed.). Münster: Libreria Regensbergiana.
- Eubel, Conradus; Gulik, Guilelmus, eds. (1923). Hierarchia catholica (in Latin). Vol. 3 (second ed.). Münster: Libreria Regensbergiana.
- Gauchat, Patritius (Patrice) (1935). Hierarchia catholica (in Latin). Vol. 4 (1592-1667). Münster: Libraria Regensbergiana.
- Ritzler, Remigius; Sefrin, Pirminus (1952). Hierarchia catholica medii et recentis aevi (in Latin). Vol. V (1667-1730). Patavii: Messagero di S. Antonio.
- Ritzler, Remigius; Sefrin, Pirminus (1958). Hierarchia catholica medii et recentis aevi (in Latin). Vol. VI (1730-1799). Patavii: Messagero di S. Antonio.
- Ritzler, Remigius; Sefrin, Pirminus (1968). Hierarchia Catholica medii et recentioris aevi (in Latin). Vol. VII (1800–1846). Monasterii: Libr. Regensburgiana.
- Remigius Ritzler; Pirminus Sefrin (1978). Hierarchia catholica Medii et recentioris aevi (in Latin). Vol. VIII (1846–1903). Il Messaggero di S. Antonio.
- Pięta, Zenon (2002). Hierarchia catholica medii et recentioris aevi (in Latin). Vol. IX (1903–1922). Padua: Messagero di San Antonio. ISBN 978-88-250-1000-8.
- Sainte-Marthe, Denis de; Hauréau, Barthélemy (1739). Gallia Christiana: In Provincias Ecclesiasticas Distributa, De provincia Narbonensi (in Latin). Vol. Tomus sextus (VI). Paris: Typographia Regia. Pages 860–1028; Instrumenta, pp. 411–475.

=== Studies ===
- Bouges, Thomas Augustin (1741). Histoire ecclesiastique et civile de la ville et diocése de Carcassonne: avec les pièces justificatives & une notice ancienne & moderne de ce diocése (in French). Paris: Chez Pierre Gandouin, Pierre Emery, Pierre Piget.
- Carayon, Charles (1903). L'Inquisition à Carcassonne au XIIIe et au XIVe siècle (in French). Paris: C. Lacour. ISBN 978-2-84149-761-4.
- Charpentier, Léon (1907). L'épiscopat français depuis le Concordat jusqu'à la Séparation (1802-1905). Paris: Librairie des Saints-Pères.
- De Vic, Cl.; Vaissete, J. (1876). Histoire générale de Languedoc (in French). Vol. Tome IV. Toulouse: Edouard Privat. [Archbishops of Narbonne].
- De Vic, Claude; Vaissete, J. (1745). Histoire générale de Languedoc avec des notes et les pièces justificatives (in French). Vol. 5. Paris: chez Jacques Vincent.
- Douais, Célestin (1900). Documents pour servir à l'histoire de l'Inquisition dans le Languedoc (in Latin and French). Vol. Deuxième partie: Textes. Paris: Renouard.
- Du Mege de la Haye, Alexandre (1832–1833). "Notice sur le tombeau de Saint-Hilaire, évêque de Carcassonne". Mémoires de la Société archéologique du midi de la France. 1: 83–92.
- Duchesne, Louis (1907). Fastes épiscopaux de l'ancienne Gaule: I. Provinces du Sud-Est (in French) (2nd ed.). Paris: Fontemoing. pp. 289–295, 307–308.
- Jean, Armand (1891). Les évêques et les archevêques de France depuis 1682 jusqu'à 1801 (in French). Paris: A. Picard.
- Poux, Joseph (1922–1938). La cité de Carcassonne: histoire et description (in French). Vol. 5 volumes. Toulouse: É. Privat.
- Vidal, Jean-Marie (1903). Un Inquisiteur jugé par ses "victimes": Jean Galand et les Carcassonnais (in French). Paris: A. Picard.

=== Collections ===
- Douais, Célestin (1900). Documents pour servir à l'histoire de l'Inquisition dans le Languedoc: publiés pour la Société de l'histoire de France (in French). Vol. 1. Paris: Honoré Champion.
- Fédération historique du Languedoc méditerranéen et du Roussillon (1970). Carcassonne et sa région: actes des 41e et 24e Congrès d'études régionales. Fédération historique du Languedoc et du Roussillon. [papers given at a congress]
- Mahul, Alphonse Jacques (1867). Cartulaire et archives des communes de l'ancien diocèse et de l'arrondissement administratif de Carcassonne: Villes-Villages-Églises-Abbayes-Prieurés-Chateaux-Seigneuries-Fiefs-Généalogies-Blasons-Métaires-Lieux bâtis- Quartiers ruraux-Notes statistiques (in French and Latin). Vol. 5. Paris: Didron. [Bishops of Carcassonne: pp. 390–535]

=== For further reading ===
- Sparks, Chris (2014). Heresy, Inquisition and Life Cycle in Medieval Languedoc. York: Boydell & Brewer Ltd. ISBN 978-1-903153-52-9.
- Strayer, Joseph Reese (1992). The Albigensian Crusades. Ann Arbor MI USA: University of Michigan Press. ISBN 0-472-06476-2.
- Sumption, Jonathan (2011). The Albigensian Crusade. London: Faber & Faber. ISBN 978-0-571-26657-9.
- Vaux De Cernay, Pierre (1951). P. Guebin and H. Maisonneuve (ed.). Histoire Albigeoise (in French). Paris: Vrin. ISBN 978-2-7116-0608-5.
