= Ouanes Amor =

French painter (1936–2024)

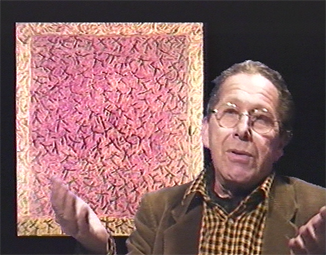
- Amor in 1995
- Born: January 1, 1936; Kerkennah
- Died: December 25, 2024 (aged 88)
- Occupations: Painter; Visual artist

Ouanes Amor (Arabic: وناس عمر; 10 October 1936 – 25 December 2024) was a French painter.

He was born in Tunisia and emigrated to France at the age of 17. In 1960, became a student of Roger Chastel, and in 1970, he became an assistant to Gustave Singier. In 1980, Amor became a professor at the École nationale supérieure des Beaux-Arts in Paris. The French painter Cécile Partouche and German artist Arnd Kaestner were his students.

Amor's work is represented in the collections of the Musée d'Art Moderne de la Ville de Paris and the New National Museum of Monaco.
