= Élisabeth Cibot =

French sculptor and art historian

Élisabeth Cibot (French: [elizabɛt sibo]; born 1960 in Nantes, Pays de la Loire) is a French sculptor and art historian.

== Biography ==
Born into an artistic family, collectors of Italian Renaissance bronzes, Élisabeth Cibot has been surrounded by sculpture ever since her birth. She studied art form at France's major art school, the École nationale supérieure des Beaux-Arts (ENSBA) under the direction of great sculptors such as Etienne Martin, Léopold Kretz and CESAR. From 1981 to 1983, she worked with painter Riccardo Licata at Centro Internazionale di Grafica in Venice. She was also guest artist at the Harvey Littleton Glass School at Spruce Pine, USA in 1983. Since then she has developed a strong interest in glass and mixed media furniture design. In parallel to her artistic creation, she studied art history, presenting her first thesis, on Roman Archeology, in 1984 which was followed by a DEA (Diploma in Specialist Studies) in the History of Techniques in 1990. In 1993, she returned to bronze statuary and monumental work. Since 1997 she lives and works near Paris. She claims "Art is a support for our questioning about the world and the meaning of life, a path of self-knowledge that makes us capable of opening up to others. On this road, I seek while building."

== Awards and distinctions ==
- 2017: Conti Sculpture Award (presented by Mr Michel Poniatowsky)
- 2015: Gold medal of sculpture (Société Nationale des Beaux-Arts)
- 2013: Camille Claudel Sculpture Award, Société Nationale des Beaux-Arts
- 2009: Grant from the Fondation Taylor
- 2006: Gabriel Diana Award, Société Nationale des Beaux-Arts
- 2005: Award, Fondation Taylor
- 2004: Paul Belmondo Award, Salon d’Automne
- 2003: Sculpture Award, Amis du Salon d’Automne
- 2000: Michel Dumont Award, Salon des Artistes Français
- 1997: Bronze medal, Salon des Artistes Français

Recognition

- Permanent Member of the Salon d'Automne
- Permanent Member of the Société Nationale des Beaux-Arts

== List of permanent public installations ==
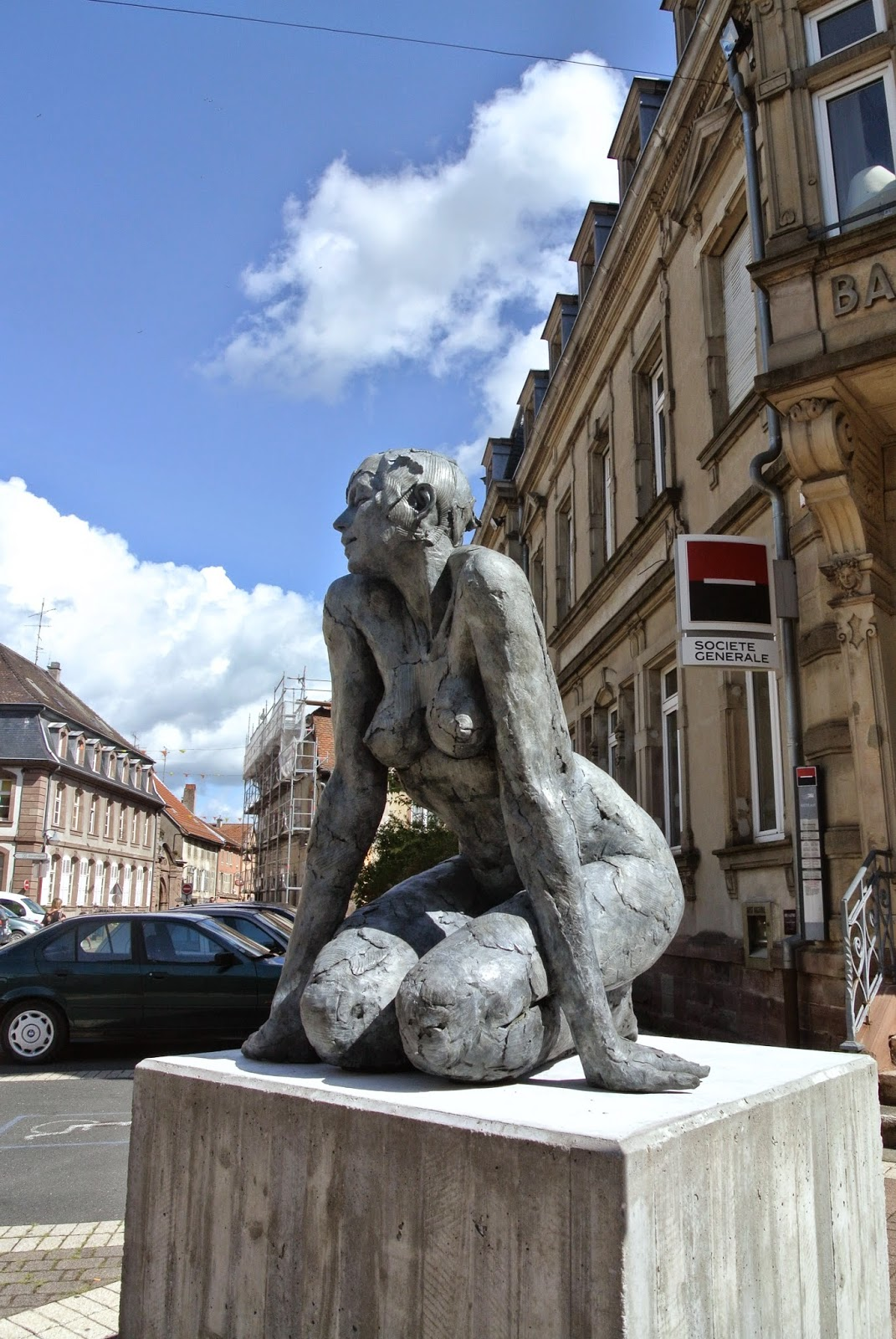
"TELLINA" E.Cibot - Bronze - France

- Lalbenque, "Lo Trufair" (bronze 1,20 m), City Hall
- Sarrebourg : "Tellina" (bronze 1.50 M H)
- Calais : "Homage to Charles de Gaulle et Yvonne Vendroux"(bronze 3 M H)
- Nogent-sur-Marne: « Lady of Val Nure » (bronze 2.50 m H)
- Lyon : "Homage to Pope Jean-Paul II" (bronze 3 m H)
- Drancy : "Homage to Charles de Gaulle"
- Nantes, Monument « Captain Nemo and Jules Verne »
- Pontault-Combault : Monumental bust of François Mitterrand
- Béthune : Monumental bust of François Mitterrand
- Vouziers : "François Mitterrand and his dog"
- Béthune : Monumental bust of Willy Brandt

== Bibliography ==
- Création et innovation chez Baccarat et Daum entre 1890 et 1990, Élisabeth Cibot-Genin - 1992
- Création artistique et innovation dans l'industrie verrière en France 1880-1989, Élisabeth Cibot-Genin - 2004
- Dialogues d'atelier, Élisabeth Cibot, Foreword : Julien Denoun and Jean-Philippe Ricard, Photographer : Alan Tournaille - Centro Internazionale della Grafica di Venezia - 2008
