= Alain Planet =

French prelate

Alain Émile Baptiste Planet
- Bishop Emeritus of Carcassonne and Narbonne
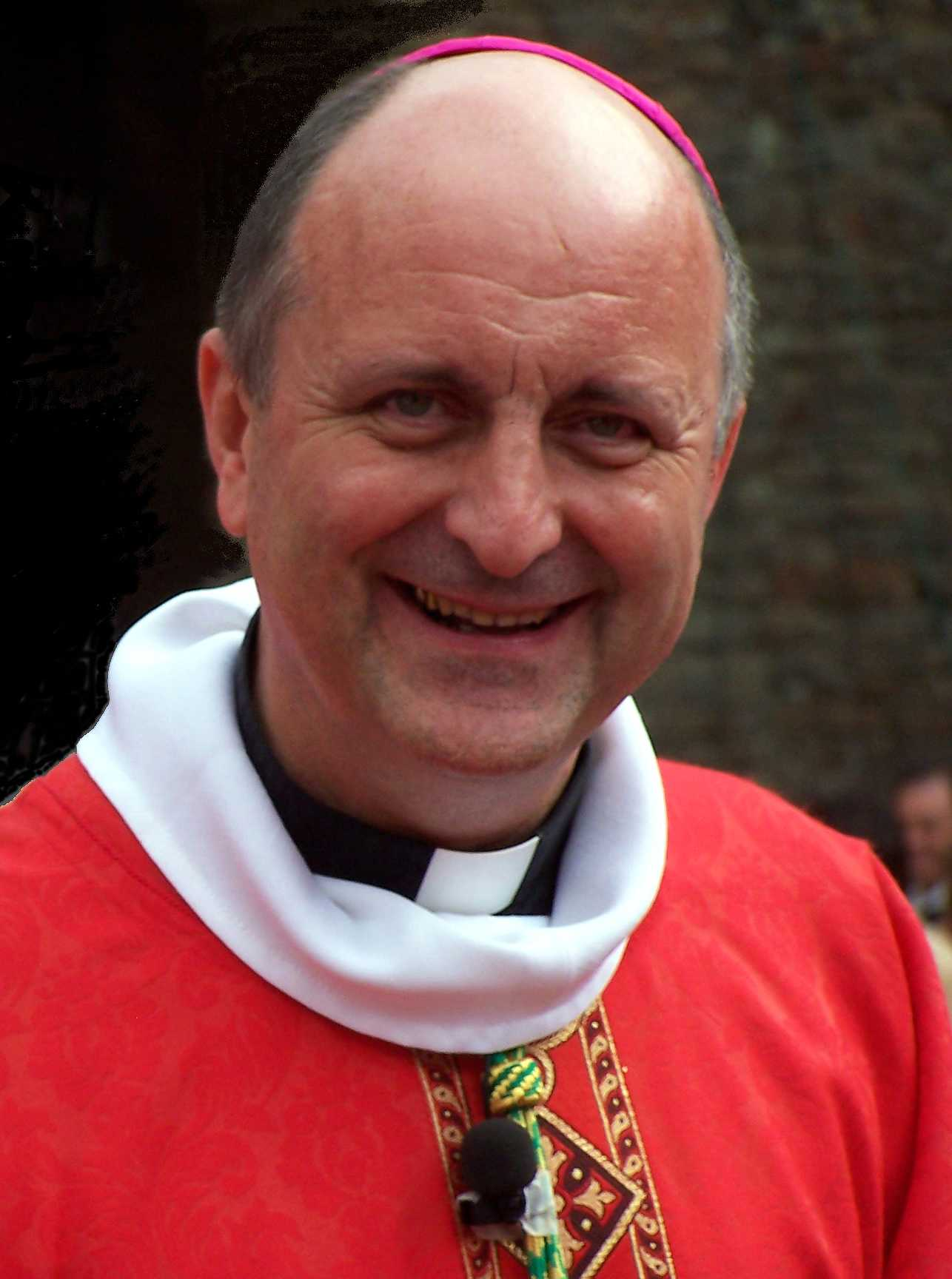
- Planet in 2013
- Church: Catholic Church
- Diocese: Diocese of Carcassonne and Narbonne
- In office: 28 June 2004 – 31 March 2023
- Predecessor: Jacques Despierre
- Successor: Bruno Valentin

Orders
- Ordination: 24 May 1981
- Consecration: 19 September 2004 by Guy Marie Alexandre Thomazeau

Personal details
- Born: 18 November 1948 (age 77) Privas, Ardèche, France
- Coat of arms

Alain Planet (born 18 November 1948) is a French prelate of the Catholic Church who was bishop of Carcassonne-Narbonne from 2004 to 2023.

== Biography ==
Alain Emile Baptiste Planet was born on 18 November 1948 in Privas, Ardèche. After completing his primary education with the Marist Brothers in Bourg-de-Péage and Romans, he studied at the Faculty of Law and Modern Literature in Grenoble, earning a licentiate in literature and a secondary school teaching certification. He taught French at the Marist college in Bourg-de-Péage and was then director of the Lycee Saint-Maurice in Romans-sur-Isère. He entered the Saint Irenaeus Seminary of Lyon in 1978 and obtained his licentiate in theology from the Catholic Faculty of Theology there.

He was ordained a priest for the Diocese of Valence on 24 May 1981. He was head of the Pastoral Care for chaplains in public education there from 1981 to 1988. From 1988 to 1995 he was moderator of the team of parish priests responsible for the center of Valence. From 1988 to 2001 he was episcopal delegate for vocations and for liturgical pastoral care and from 1988 to 2003 he was responsible for seminarians and their formation. He was secretary of the Diocesan Synod from 1992 to 1994. From 1995 to 1999 he worked on the inter-parish team of Sainte-Marie-Jean-Catherine. In 1999 he was appointed archpriest of Valence cathedral and deputy delegate for the diaconate. From 2003 to 2004 he was moderator of the team of parish priests of the parish of Notre-Dame-du-Rhône in Montélimar.

Pope John Paul II appointed him bishop of Carcassonne-Narbonne on 28 June 2004. He received his episcopal consecration on 19 September in the amphitheater of Carcasonne from Archbishop Guy Thomazeau of Montpellier. He chose as his motto Si Dieu est pour nous qui sera contre nous (If God is for us who can be against us).

He held a diocesan synod in 2007 and reorganized the diocese into 14 new parishes. In March 2018, he celebrated the memorial Mass in Trèbes for Arnaud Beltrame, the French gendarme who was killed after taking the place of a hostage.

Within the French Bishops Conference, he was responsible for sectarian aberrations (dérives sectaires) from 2015 to 2021.

Following the release of the independent report on sexual abuse in the Church in 2021, Planet said he knew of three priest aggressors, one of whom had more than forty victims. Of those only two wanted to speak with him, which proved sufficient to make him understand how sexual abuse can destroy lives.

He has served as chaplain general of the French associations of the Order of Malta.

Pope Francis accepted his resignation on 31 March 2023.
