= François Stahly =

German-French sculptor (1911–2006)

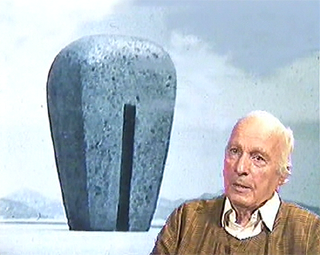
François Stahly

François Stahly (March 8, 1911 in Konstanz – July 2, 2006 in Paris) was a German-French sculptor.

In 1952 Muller exhibited alongside Étienne Martin, Marie-Thérèse Pinto and Juana Muller in a group exhibition at the galerie MAI (Meubles Architectures Installations) in Paris. His first wife, Claude, died in 1973. From the mid 1970s until his death he was married to the French-Iranian sculptor, Parvine Curie.

== Sources ==
- Works by Francois Stahly and Biographical info
