= Salon de Mai =

Group of French artists

The Salon de Mai (the May Salon) is a group of French artists which formed in a café on the Rue Dauphine in Paris in 1943 during the German occupation of France.

In 1943, the Salon de Mai was founded as an Association (declared in 1944) in opposition to Nazi ideology and its condemnation of degenerate art. It founder members were the art critic Gaston Diehl and the painters, sculptors and engravers Henri-Georges Adam, Emmanuel Auricoste, Lucien Coutaud, Robert Couturier, Jacques Despierre (who suggested naming the salon after the month in which its first meetings were held), Marcel Gili, Léon Gischia, Francis Gruber, Jean Le Moal, Alfred Manessier, André Marchand, Édouard Pignon, Gustave Singier, Claude Venard and Roger Vieillard, who together formed it direction committee. Several of them (Coutaud, Gischia, Le Moal, Manessier, Marchand, ORAZI, Pignon, Singier) participated in the 1941 exhibition Vingt jeunes peintres de tradition française.

Under its president Gaston Diehl the first Salon de Mai exhibition took place in the art galerie "Pierre Maurs" (3, avenue Matignon) from 29 May to 29 June 1945. Its honorary committee was made up of Germain Bazin, Jacques Dupont, René Huyghe, Bernard Dorival, Michel Florisoone, Pierre Ladoué and Marc Thiboutet. Its judging panel was headed by Jean Follain. The catalogue of this first Salon had a preface by Gaston Diehl, with texts by René Bertelé and André Rolland de Renéville, poems by Jacques Prévert, Lucien Becker, André Frénaud, Jean Follain and Guillevic.

Even after the liberation of Paris, and subsequently of France, logistical problems in the city remained serious and the lack of public spaces was a limitation. Consequently, in 1946 the Salon de Mai was organized on the fourth floor of the famous department store "Galeries Lafayette", in 1947 it was held at the art gallery "Arts" (140, Faubourg Saint-Honoré), in 1948 at the art gallery Lambert-Marie (22, Place Vendôme). Only in 1949 the Salon de Mai was organized in the large rooms of the "Palais de New-York" (Avenue du Président Wilson), which then hosted it until 1954. In the following years, until 1968, it was held at the "Musée d'Art Moderne de la Ville de Paris". From 1969 onwards, the Salon de Mai had to deal with major logistical problems, so its exhibition often changed address. The 64th and last Salon de Mai took place from 6 to 11 May 2014 at the "Espace Commines" (17, rue Commines).

Gaston Diehl has been the Founder - President of the Salon de Mai until his death, in 1997.

== See also ==
- Salón de Mayo, Havana, 1967

== References and sources ==
Sources

- Laurence Bertrand Dorléac, Histoire de l'art, Paris 1940-1944, Ordre national, Traditions et Modernités, preface by Michel Winock, Publications de la Sorbonne, Paris, 1986, ISBN 2-85944-122-0.
- Gaston Diehl, La Peinture en France dans les années noires, 1935-1945, Z'éditions, Nice, 1999.
