= Jacques Despierre =

French Catholic bishop

Jacques Despierre Ist. del Prado
- Bishop Emeritus of Carcassonne
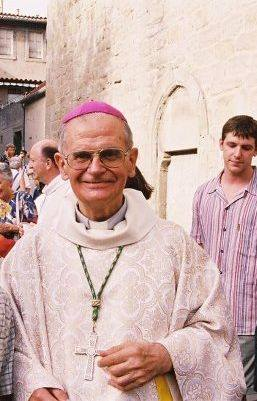
- Church: Catholic Church
- Diocese: Diocese of Carcassonne
- In office: 25 August 1982 – 28 June 2004
- Predecessor: Pierre-Marie Puech
- Successor: Alain Planet

Orders
- Ordination: 24 June 1952
- Consecration: 10 October 1982 by André Collini

Personal details
- Born: 6 May 1928 (age 98) Toulouse, Haute-Garonne, France

Jacques Despierre (born 6 May 1928) is a French Catholic bishop, and bishop emeritus of Carcassonne since 2004. He was born in Toulouse.

== Life ==
He was ordained a priest in Toulouse for the Prado Institute on 24 June 1952. He was appointed Bishop of Carcassonne on 25 August 1982 and was consecrated on 10 October that year by Bishop André Collini. On 28 June 2004 he retired for reasons of age. Bishop Alain Planet succeeded him as bishop of Carcassonne.
