= Alfred Manessier =

French painter (1911–1993)

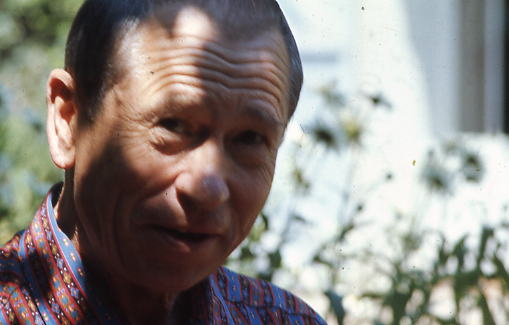
Alfred Manessier in 1971

Alfred Manessier (5 December 1911, Saint-Ouen – 1 August 1993, Orléans) was a non-figurative French painter, stained glass artist, and tapestry designer, part of the new School of Paris and the Salon de Mai.

== Biography ==
Manessier was born among fishers and masons in the Picardy province of Northern France. There was a family precedent for creative work, as the grandfather was a decorative stonemason while his father and uncle had studied at École des Beaux Arts at Abbeville. The "father gave the young man permission to go to Paris on condition that he studied architecture, which was a safer occupation than that of painter. It was not until his father, then a wholesale wine merchant in Amiens, suddenly died that he was able to change over" to his preferred art studies. He had enrolled in architecture in 1929, switched to art with Roger Bissiere at Académie Ranson in 1935 just prior to the father's death in 1936.

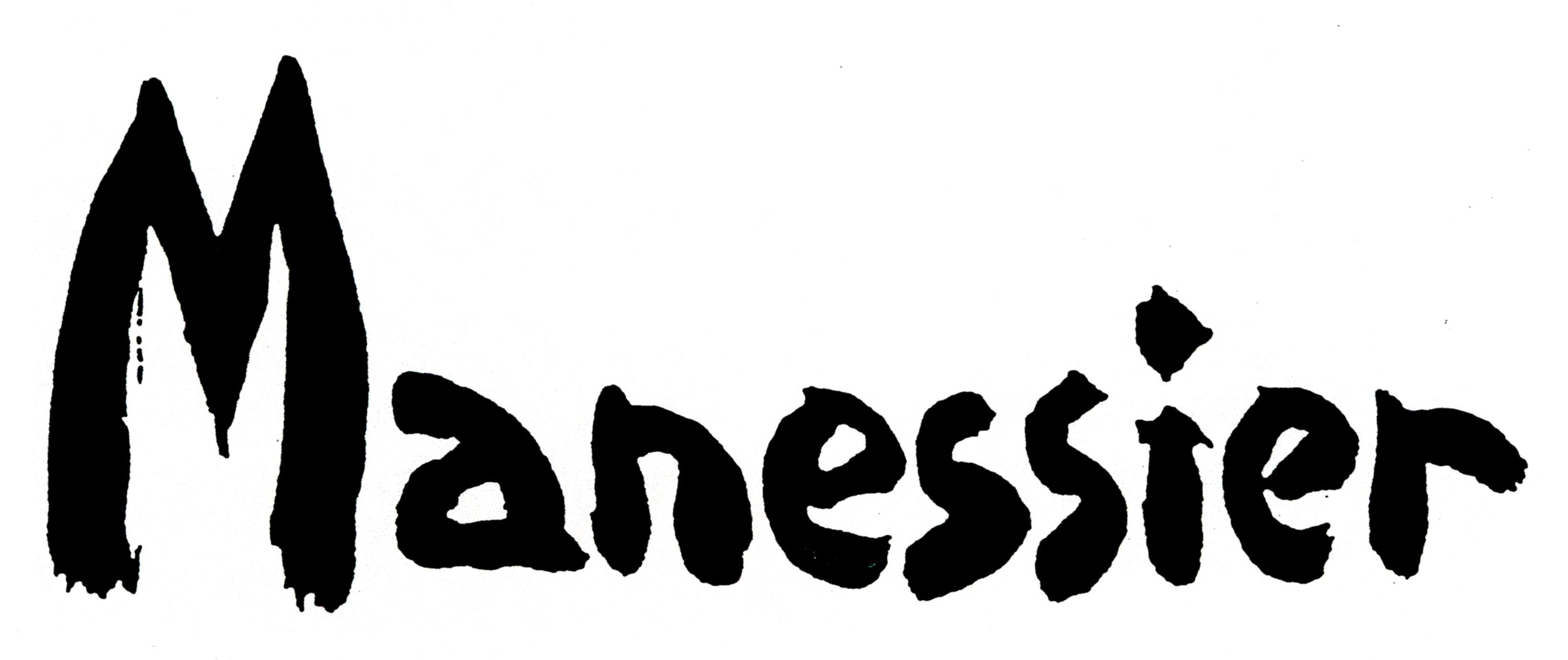
Manessier signature

In 1937 at the Paris International Exposition, the French government appointed Sonia Delaunay and Robert Delaunay to represent avant-garde art in Paris transportation centers such as Air Palace and Railways Palace. The couple was given the task to employ and reside with 50 unemployed artists for March and April to create a substantial project of 19,000 square feet (1,800 m^{2}) of artwork. Among the artists were Bissiere, Jean Bertholle, and Manessier, who worked on four murals. The following year he married painter Therese Simonnet. In 1939 Manessier was called into military conscription, as a technical draftsman. In 1940, expecting the birth of his son, he found work as a farmhand to support the growing family but by 1941 he returned to Paris to exhibit in the Gallery Braun show "20 Young Painters" that ushered into France the non-figurative movement. Despite the abstract style centered in what the occupying Germans deemed "degenerate" modes, and despite Manessier's teaching at the anti-authority and anti-indoctrination organization Young France, the painter was not censored or molested The Young France organization prepared youth for work at the end of the German Occupation, with a teaching staff that also included Jean Bazaine, Jean Vilar, Jean Desailly, Andre Clement.

Manessier left teaching in 1943 for painting full-time. During this year he made a 3-day visit to the Trappist monastery in Orne. Demoralized by the Occupation and war, at the monastery he was deeply moved by the ancient garb and art, chants and worship, rhythms of work and silence by the monks. "I felt profoundly the cosmic link between sacred chanting and the world of nature all around. These men who sang were perhaps a little out of touch with the world but there was truth in their relationship with nature" he recalled. "If we had the evangelical purity of the Primitives, if we could look at nature with all innocence of love, then perhaps we could depict the sacred as they did. But we are men of this century: broken, exploded." Thus began the fertile period of abstract painting: "mosaic-like patterns, luminous colors often supported by a heavy black grid."

Stained glass window of église Saint-Bénigne (Pontarlier)

Between paintings, he soon began to explore other mediums for expression. In 1945 his daughter was born, and the 34-year-old Manessier was commissioned to produce costumes and sets for Marie-Anne Victoire production at Studio des Champs-Élysées. In 1947 he was commissioned to produce two stained glass windows for a Breseux church. In 1949 he produced a tapestry for the Dominicans of Saulchoir, Seine-et-Oise. These other mediums were ongoing supplements to his painting, throughout his career (selected theatre work includes a 1960 Nervi Italy mounting of the Decameron involving 340 costumes and 18 sets, costumes for a 1963 production of Galileo Galilei at Theatre National Populaire, Paris; selected stained glass work includes 1952 project at All Saints Church in Basel, 1957 project at Chapel of Ste Therese in Nord, 1959 at Munsterkirche in Essen, 1964 at St Gereau in Cologne, and 1968 for Paris' Convent of the Soeurs de l'Assomption; selected tapestry work includes 1952 commission for State of France, 1957 benediction cape for a Nord church, and a 1969 commission for the National Arts Center in Ottawa).

This latter project in Canada triggered for Manessier another spiritual awakening. When visiting Canada in 1967 to view the projected Arts building site and to assess the Ottawa light, he was inspired during discussions of Canada's large areas of undeveloped land and Inuit art and life relatively untouched by Western culture: "I had a feeling of having penetrated elemental nature. The bottom of the lake is full of roots and of decomposed vegetation, and nature is reborn by way of all this. Never have I experienced a similar sensation. I discovered a prehistoric dimension."

He was the victim of a car accident in Loiret on 28 July 1993, and died four days later at the Source hospital in Orléans. His funeral was held at the church of Saint-Sépulcre d'Abbeville and he was buried in the Cimetière de Saint-Ouen at his birthplace.

== Selected awards ==
- 1953 São Paulo Biennale, 1st Prize for Painting
- 1954 Vienna Exhibition of Sacred Art, 1st Prize
- 1955 Carnegie Institute Pittsburgh, International Grand Prize for Contemporary Painting
- 1955 Valencia Venezuela, International Painting Prize
- 1958 Grenchen Switzerland Triennale, 1st Prize for Engravings
- 1958 Venice Biennale, International Institute of Liturgical Art: for painting «Crown of Thorns» (Fr. Couronne d’épines), 1952.
- 1962 Venice Biennale, International Grand Prix for Painting

== Selected museums and public collections ==
- Cologne, Wallraf-Richartz-Museum
- Berlin, Nationalgalerie
- Rio de Janeiro, Museo de Arte Moderna
- Helsinki, Kunstmuseum Atheneum
- Paris, Ministère des Affaires Culturelles
- Le Havre, Le Havre Musee
- Rotterdam, Museum Boymans Van Beuningen
- Turin, Museo Civico
- Luxembourg, Musee d'Histoire et d'Art
- Oslo, Nasjonalgalleriet
- Malmo, Malmo Museum
- Melbourne, National Gallery of Victoria
- Stockholm, Moderna Museet
- Zurich, Kunsthaus
- New York, Guggenheim Museum
- New York, Museum of Modern Art
- DC, Phillips Collection
- Bechtler Museum, Charlotte, NC
- University of Agder, Art Collection, Norway
