= André Marchand (painter) =

French painter

André Marchand (10 February 1907 – 29 December 1997) was a French painter of the new Paris school and one of the founder members of the Salon de Mai.

== Life ==
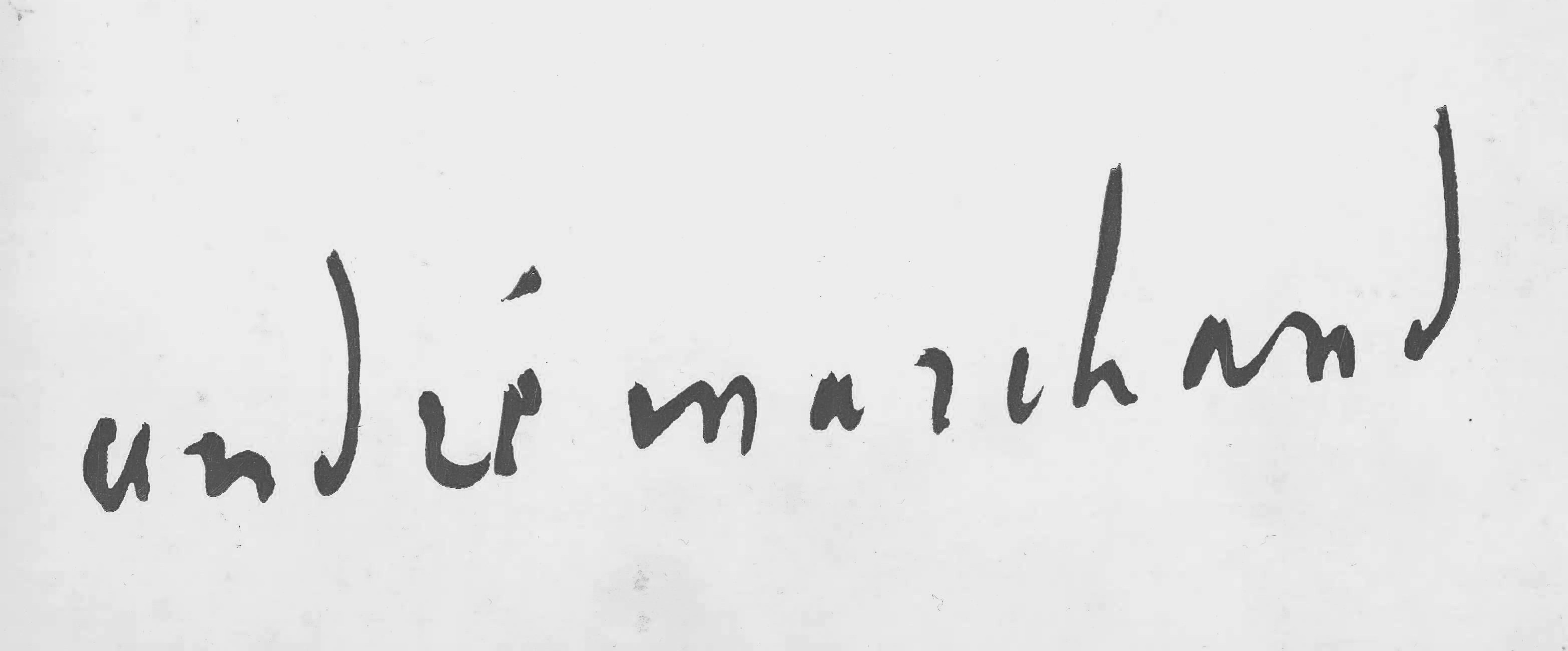
André Marchand's signature

Marchand was born at Aix-en-Provence, a few months after the death of Paul Cézanne; in 1918 he lost his mother. He studied at the Jesuit secondary school at which his father taught maths, and began to paint aged 14, using Montagne Sainte-Victoire as the subject for his first watercolours.
