= Gustave Singier =

French painter

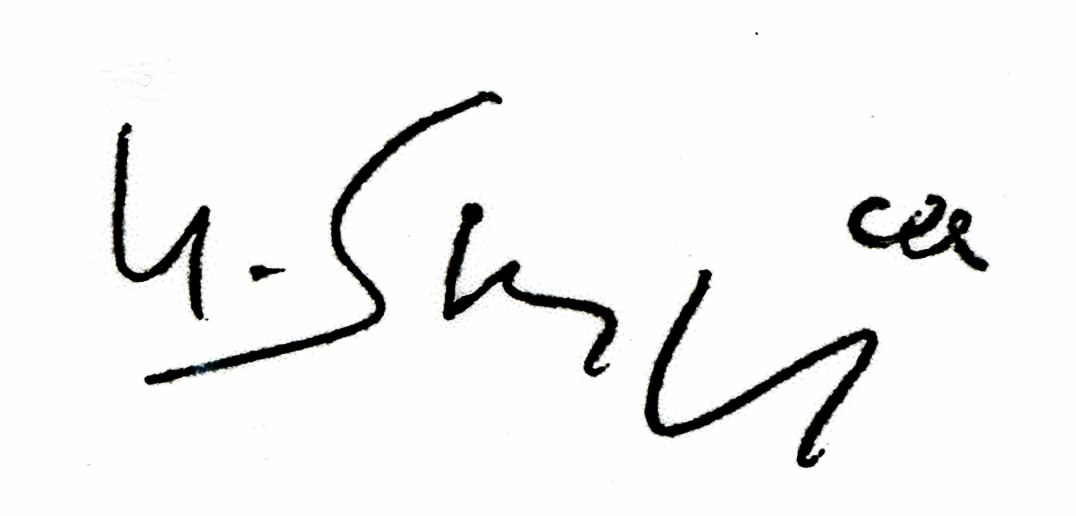
Signature of the painter Gustave Singier

Gustave Singier (11 February 1909, Warneton – 5 May 1984, Paris) was a Belgian non-figurative painter active in France as part of the new Paris School of Lyrical Abstraction and the Salon de Mai.

== Early life ==
He spent his childhood in German-occupied Belgium, then moved to France in 1919. From the age of 14, he started to paint. In 1923 he enrolled as a student at the Boulle school, attending until 1926. From 1927, he worked as a draughtsman, designing interior architecture and furniture until 1936.

1936 could be considered to be a turning point in Singier's career as an artist: he met the painter Charles Walch who encouraged him as a painter, put him in contact with artistic circles and who began to exhibit Singier's work at numerous Parisian Salons from 1936.

== World War II ==
In 1940, with World War II now underway, Singier was mobilized in the Belgian army and sent to Bagnols-on-Ceze after the German invasion of Belgium. From 1941 to 1944, Singier worked in the workshop of his cabinet maker father. In 1941, Singier joined a group of young artists who showed their work in the exhibition 'Vingt Peintres de tradition francaise' (Twenty Painters of the French Tradition) at the Braun Gallery, an exhibition in defiance of the Nazi military occupation.

== Career ==
In 1945 he was one of the founding members of the Salon de Mai. In common with many other painters of his generation, after the allied liberation of Western Europe, Singier discovered Kandinsky, Klee, Mondrian and - through them - abstract art.

In 1947 Singier was naturalized as a French citizen.

In 1949, he had his first solo exhibition at the Billiet-Caputo gallery.

From 1951 to 1954, Singier taught at the Ranson Academy, and from 1967 to 1978 at the Paris School of Art.

Singier died on 5 May 1984. He is buried in Paris, in the Montparnasse Cemetery.

== See also ==
- Ouanes Amor
