= Jean Bertholle =

French painter

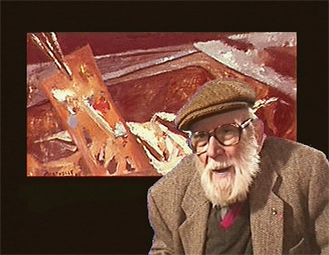
Jean Bertholle in 1995 (Screen capture of a video from the Encyclopédie audiovisuelle de l'art contemporain).

Jean Bertholle (26 June 1909, Dijon – 6 December 1996, Paris) was a French painter of the new Paris School.

Preceded by André Planson	Seat 8 of the Académie des Beaux-Arts; 1983-1997	Succeeded by Guy de Rougemont
