= Gabriel Robin =

French painter (1902–1970)

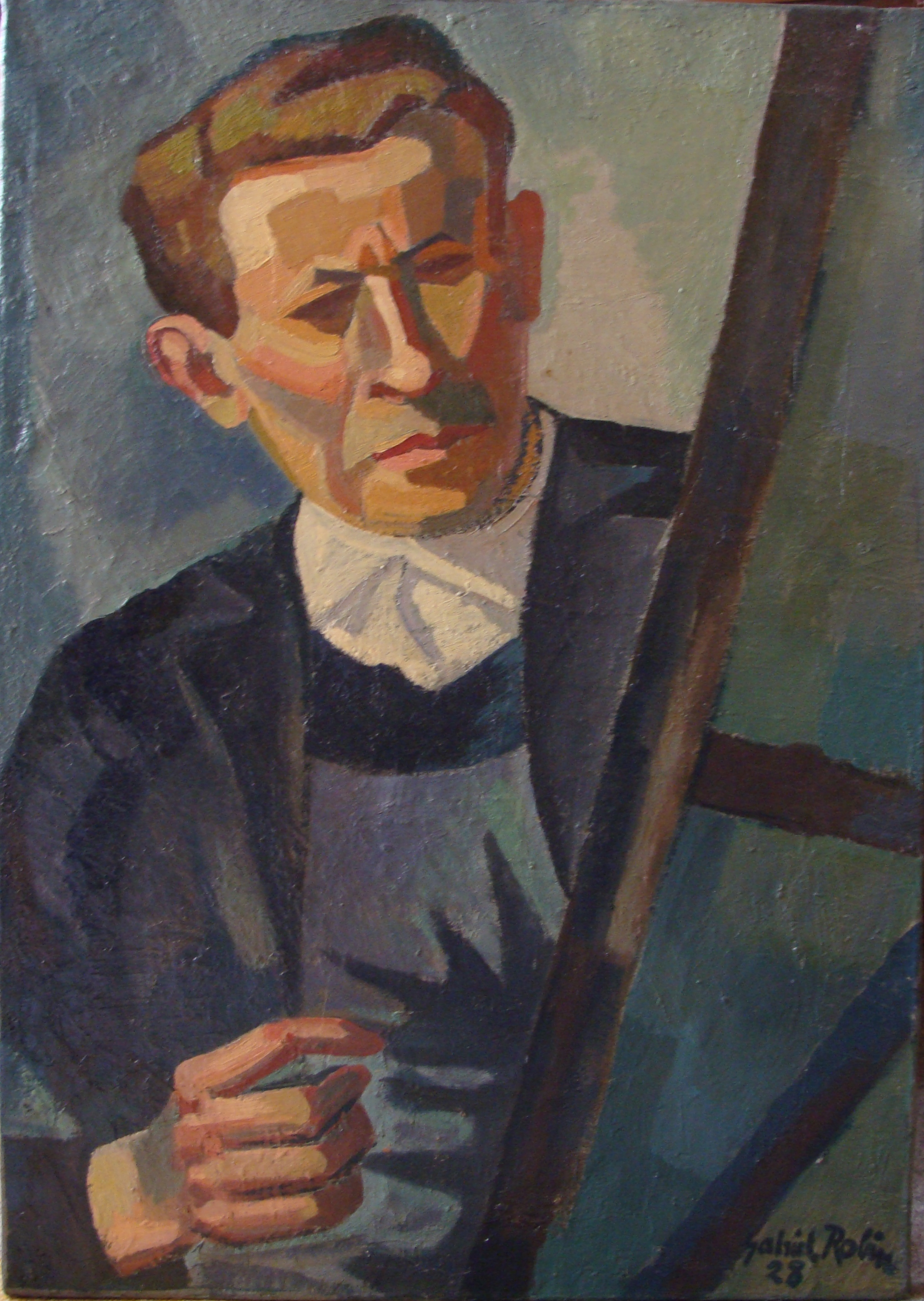
- Born: 28 May 1902; Nantes, Loire-Atlantique
- Died: 1 August 1970 (aged 68); Aulnay-sous-Bois, Seine-Saint-Denis
- Known for: Painting, drawing
- Movement: Cubism, Fauvism, Impressionism

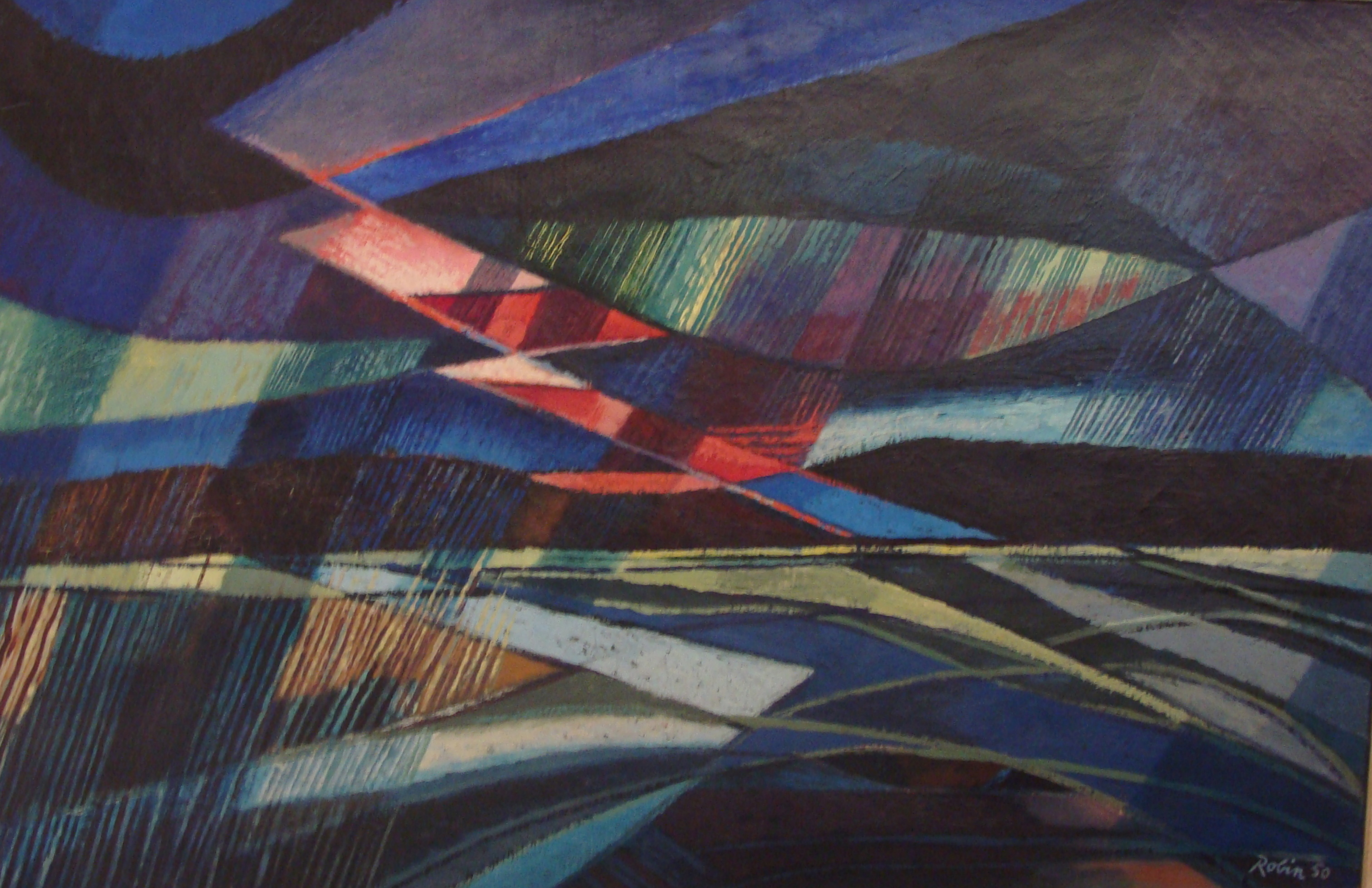
Terres froides : l'orage sur la plaine, 1950 (Cold lands, thunderstorm on the plain, oil on canvas, 92 × 60 cm), private collection

Gabriel Robin (1902 in Nantes – 1970 in Aulnay-sous-Bois) was a French painter of the new École de Paris.

== Biography ==
After practicing various crafts in factories and on construction sites, Gabriel Robin, who attended five years of evening drawing classes at the Ecole des Beaux-Arts in Belleville, set up his studio above the house he built in Aulnay in 1931 in which he shared his time between his profession as a cobbler in the morning, and his passion for painting the rest of the day.

In 1932, as one of the founding members of the group called the Indélicats, he participated to its activities. They published an anarchist magazine, in the form of booklets containing ten linocuts (engravings on linoleum) printed at about a hundred copies, which took a political and critical look on society. Some of the social issues dealt with by Estève, Pignon, Roger Falck, Georges Ort, Adrien Cumora, Gisèle Delsine, Louis Féron, Fougeron, Marcel Debarbieux and Gabriel Robin with very effective graphic force were Bastille Day (14 July), unemployment, the elite, athletes, colonization and war.

Paul Rosenberg was the first art dealer to take notice of Robin. He went to visit him in Aulnay-sous-Bois in 1938 and immediately bought two large canvases Robin had just finished.

Rosenberg showed these paintings to Braque and Picasso and Braque advised him to keep an eye on the artist. He went back to Aulnay several times and bought a dozen canvases. The declaration of war interrupted these transactions as Paul Rosenberg left for the United States in 1940 in order to escape the Nazis and later opened a gallery in New York.

During his career as an artist, recognized both by critics and by the art market, Robin took part in many exhibitions with his friends Esteve, Fougeron and Pignon.

In February 1943, he participated in the exhibition Douze peintres d’aujourd’hui (Twelve Painters of Today) organized by the art critic Gaston Diehl (who founded the Salon de Mai that same year) t the Galerie de France. It also included the painters Bazaine, Borès, Estève, Fougeron, Gischia, Lapicque, Le Moal, Manessier, Pignon, Robin, Singier and Jacques Villon.

It is thanks to André Lhote and Jacques Villon, with whom he had a long time friendship that Robin rose to great successes. André Lhote and his wife, Simone Camin, were very interested by Robin's colorful research built upon the work of Georges de La Tour, nd they organized his first solo exhibition at the gallery Pittoresque in 1943.

In 1945, René Drouin, who had just founded his gallery Place Vendôme, signed a contract with him as well as with Fougeron Gischia, Singier, Manessier and Le Moal.

Two years later, he signed with the Billiet – Caputo gallery which organized two exhibitions of his work.

Until 1950, Robin exhibited his works many times in Paris in places such as the Salon d’automne, and at the exhibition on French Contemporary Art (in 1946) at the Musée du Luxembourg. He also presented his works in Lyon (Galerie Folklore of Marcel Michaud in 1945), in Saint-Étienne (an exhibition entitled Young Masters of the School of Paris in 1946 at the Musée de Saint-Etienne), in Nantes (Galerie Michel Columb in 1946 and 1948, and at the Galerie Mignon – Massart in 1950) and finally in Lille (Galerie Evrard in 1950).

He will also exhibit in Rio de Janeiro and São Paulo in 1945 at French Painters Today exhibition and in Tokyo et Osaka ein 1962, during the International Exhibition of French Painting.

In the early fifties, Robin started moving away from the glowing lights à la Georges de la Tour and began a new visual and stylistic research close to lyrical abstractionism (abstraction lyrique).

The art market did not like this change and started moving away from Robin.

During the same period, he was an active member of Orphéon, a bunch of friends from Aulnay (Jean Buclet, Guy Robin, Georges Sénéchal, Jacques Six, André Laude et Serge Wellens and Wellens) who shared the common desire to bring poetry to the suburbs and make it a living thing.

The artist went back to his cobbler shop in Aulnay-sous-Bois. He continued painting, away from the art market, until his death in 1970.

A year after his death, a retrospective of Robin's work was presented at the City Hall of Martel (Lot), during the Roger Vitrac festival.

In November and December 2008, his adopted hometown of Aulnay honored him with a retrospective at the Espace Gainville and showed a selection of his works in the exhibition entitled Lights, Colors, Shapes: Creation in France during the Years 1940 – 1950 at the l'Hôtel of Ville of Aulnay-sous-Bois.

== The work ==
In his early years, Gabriel Robin was influenced by Impressionism (Sisley), Fauvisme (Vlaminck, Derain), Cubism (Juan Gris, André Lhote, La Fresnaye).

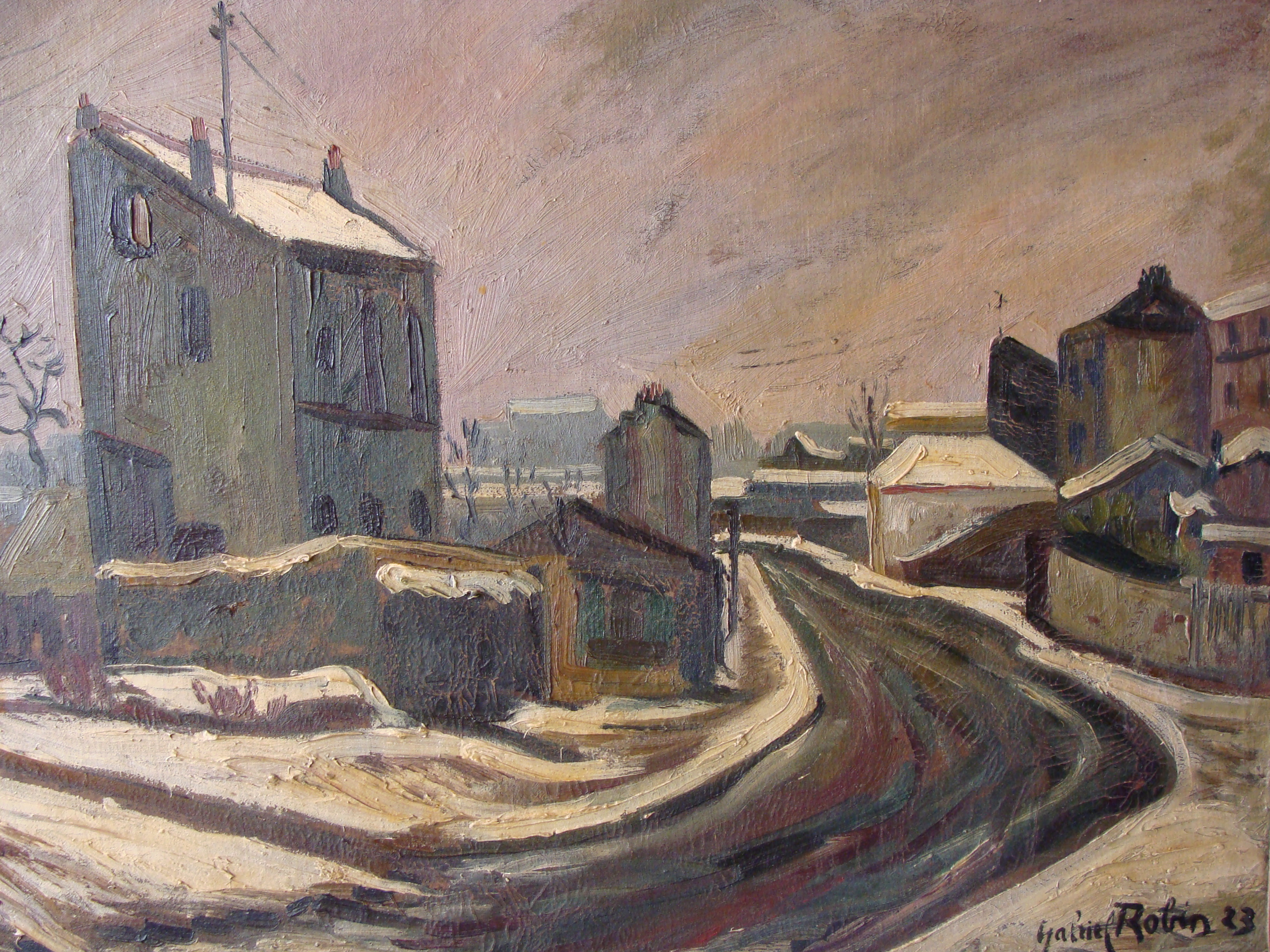
1923 - Paysage de neige à Gentilly (Snow landscape in Gentilly's village)

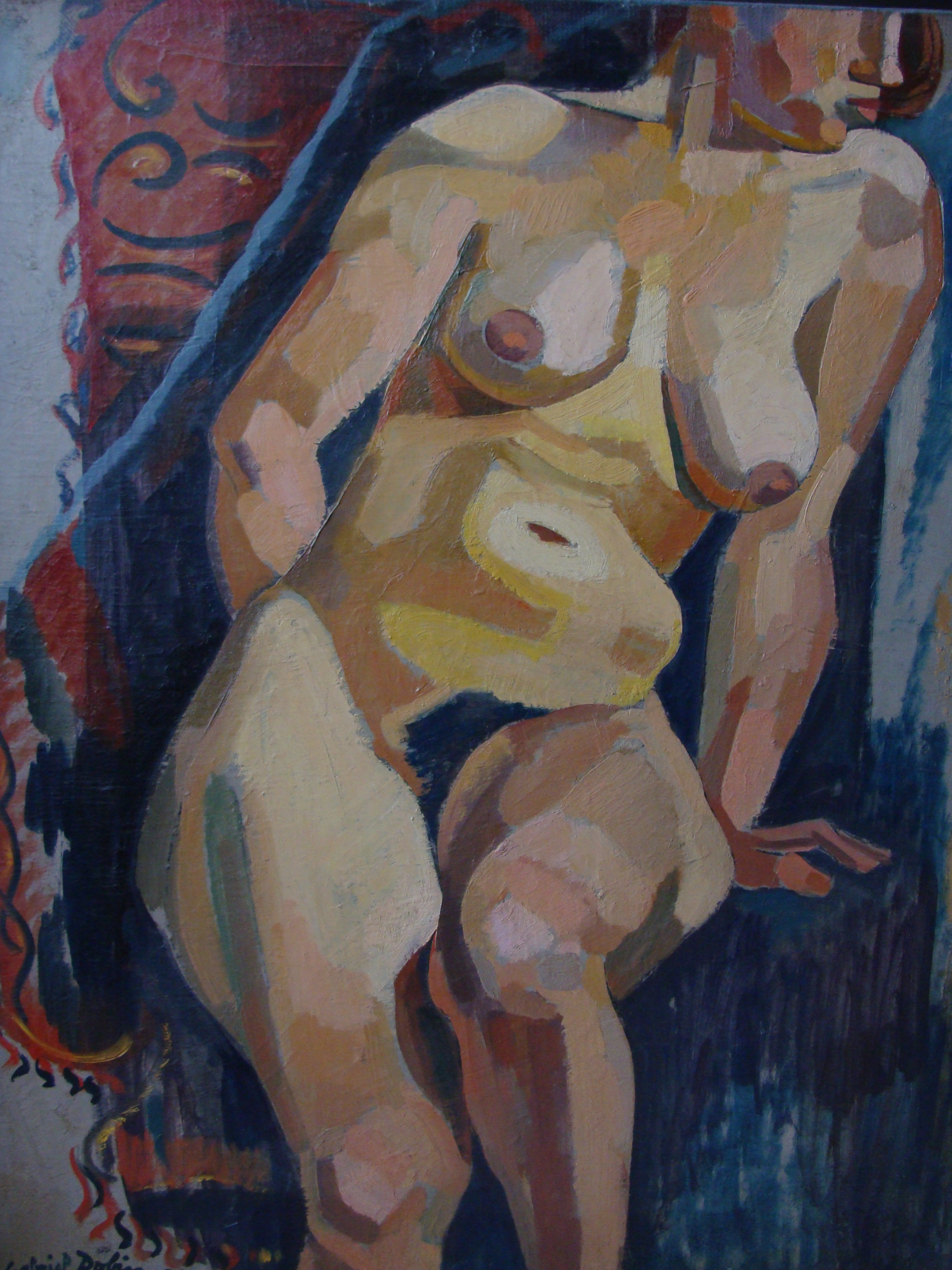
1924 - La Flamande (The Flemish woman)

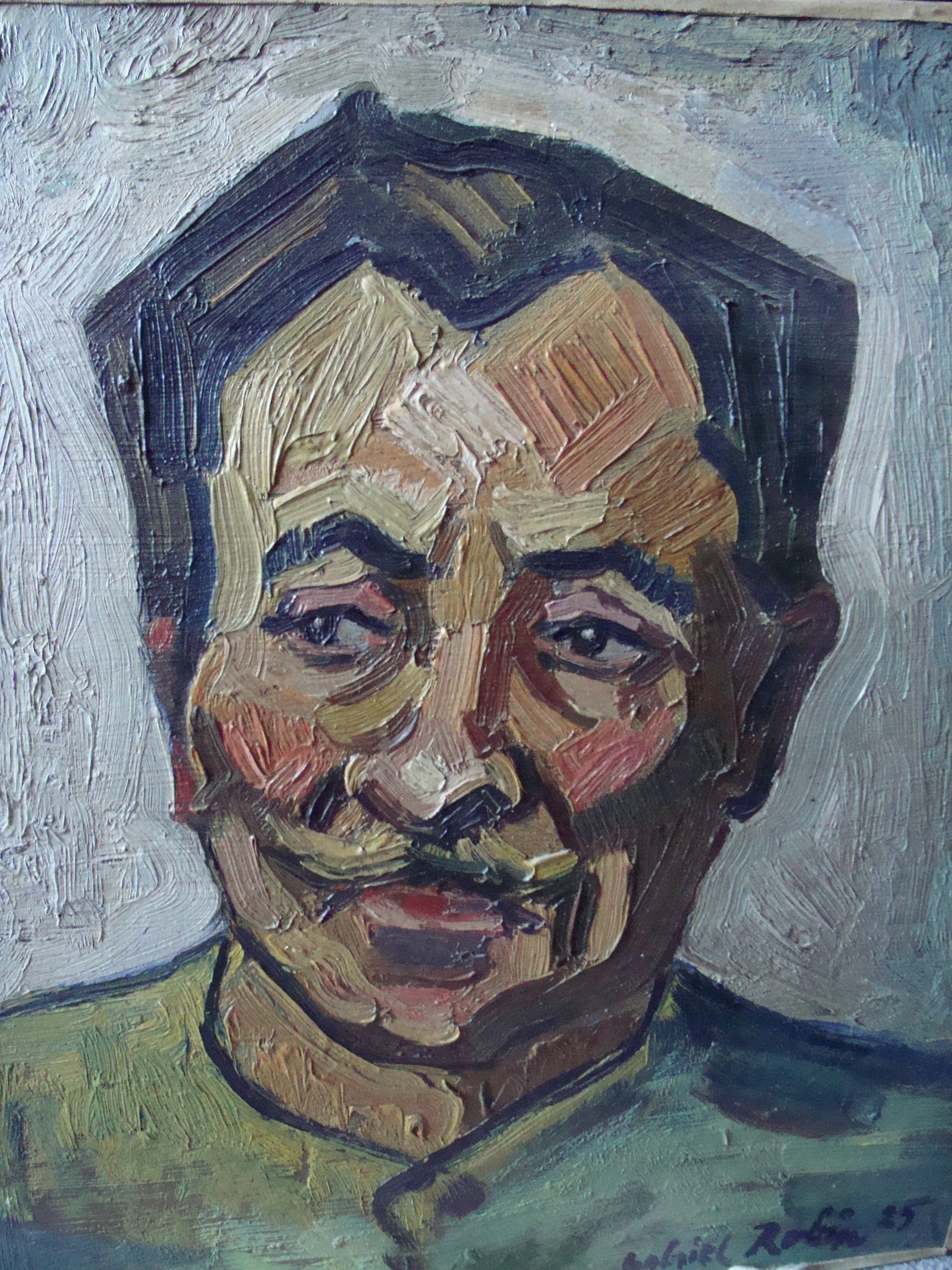
1925 - Mon père (My father)

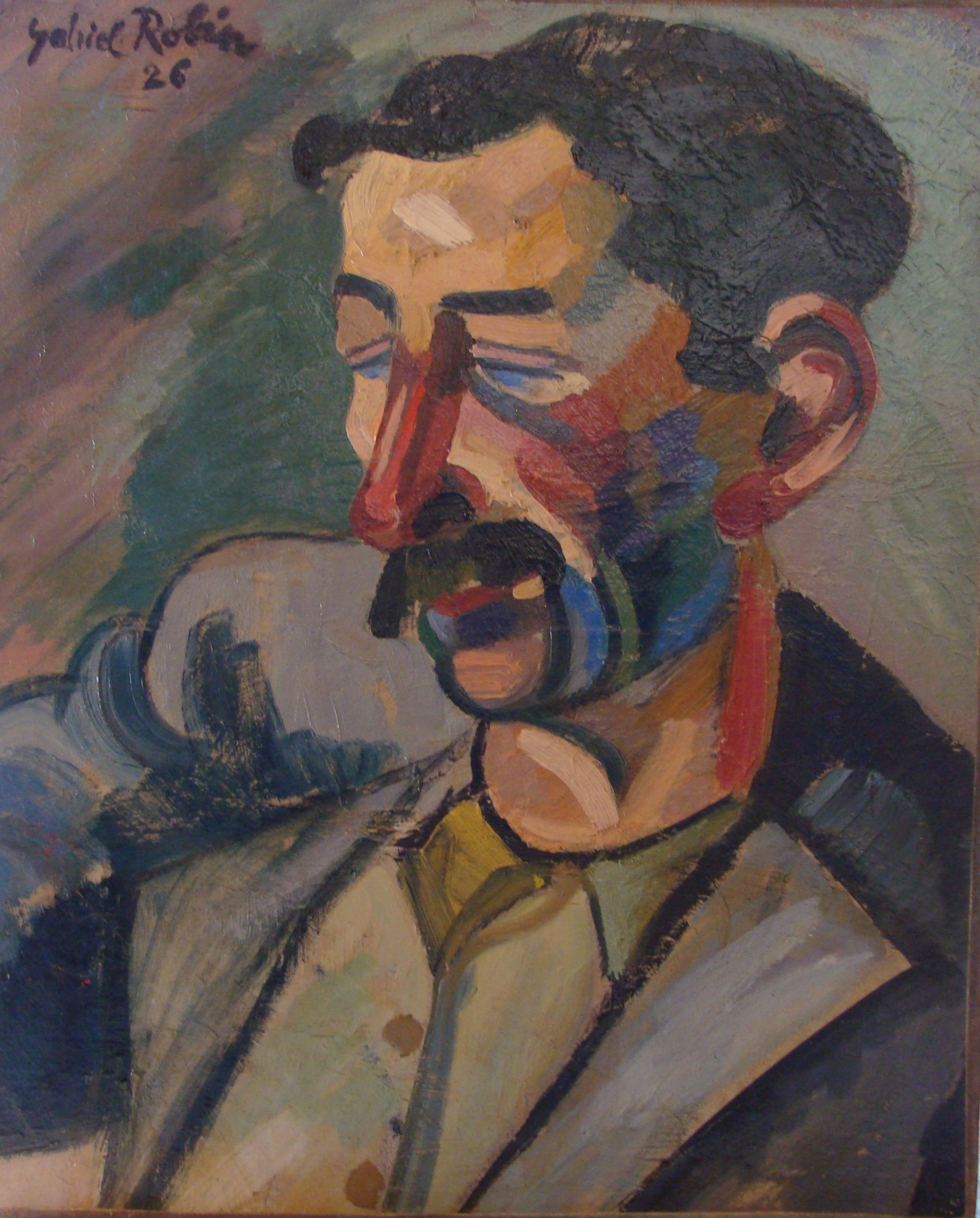
1926 - Portrait d'un ivrogne (Portrait of a drunkard)

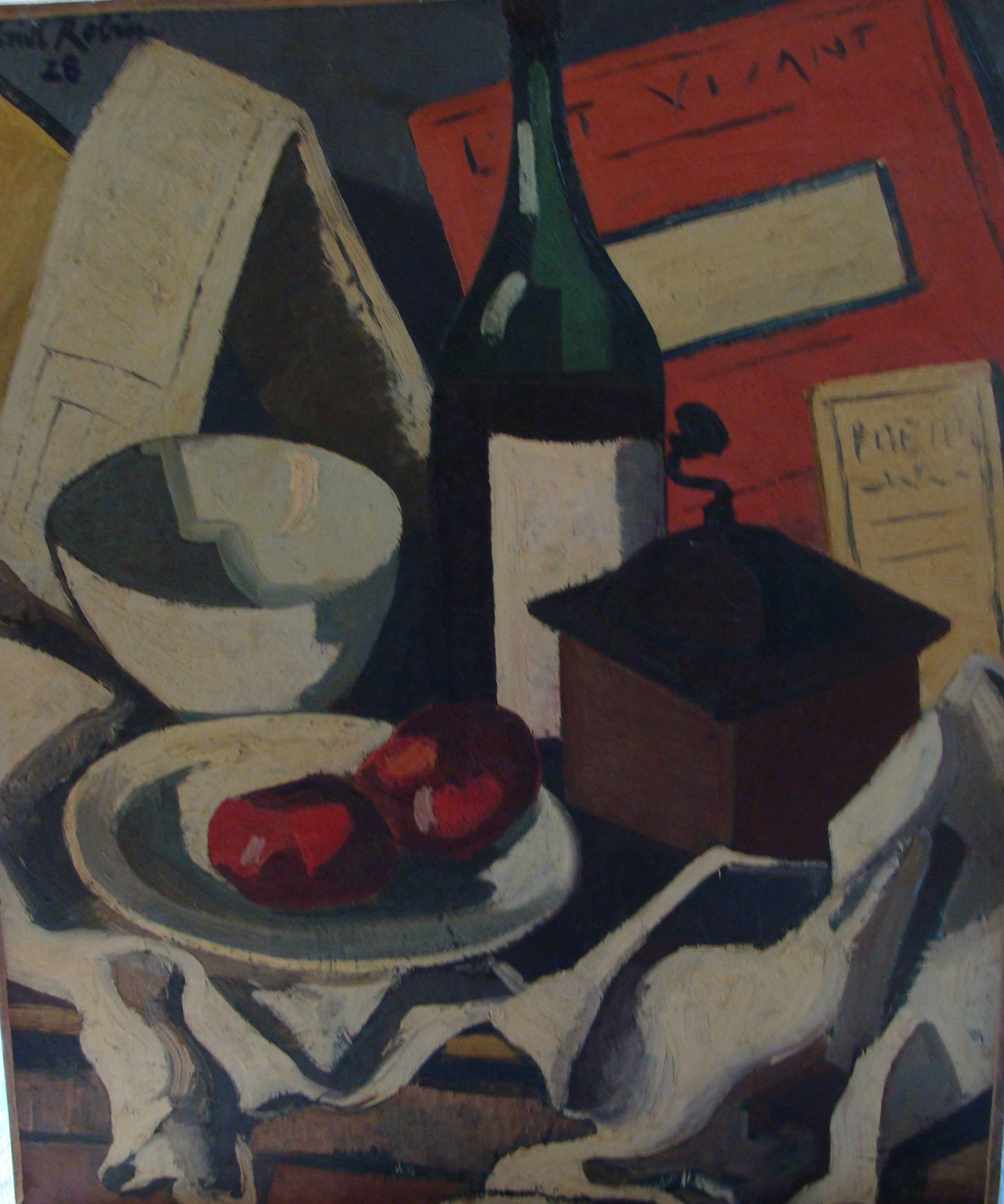
1928 - Bol, bouteille, livre (Bowl, bottle, book)

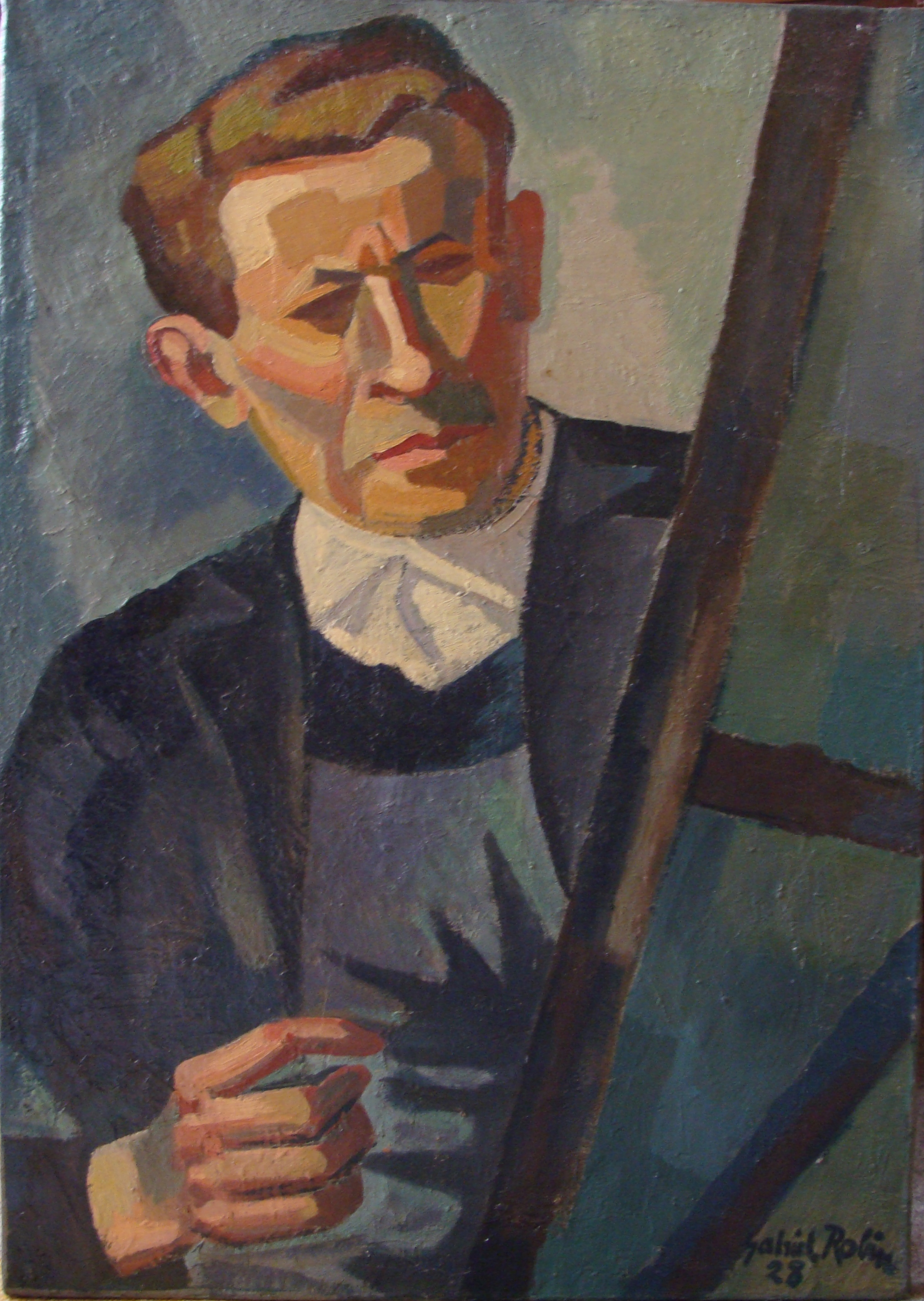
1928- Portrait de l'auteur (Portrait of the author)

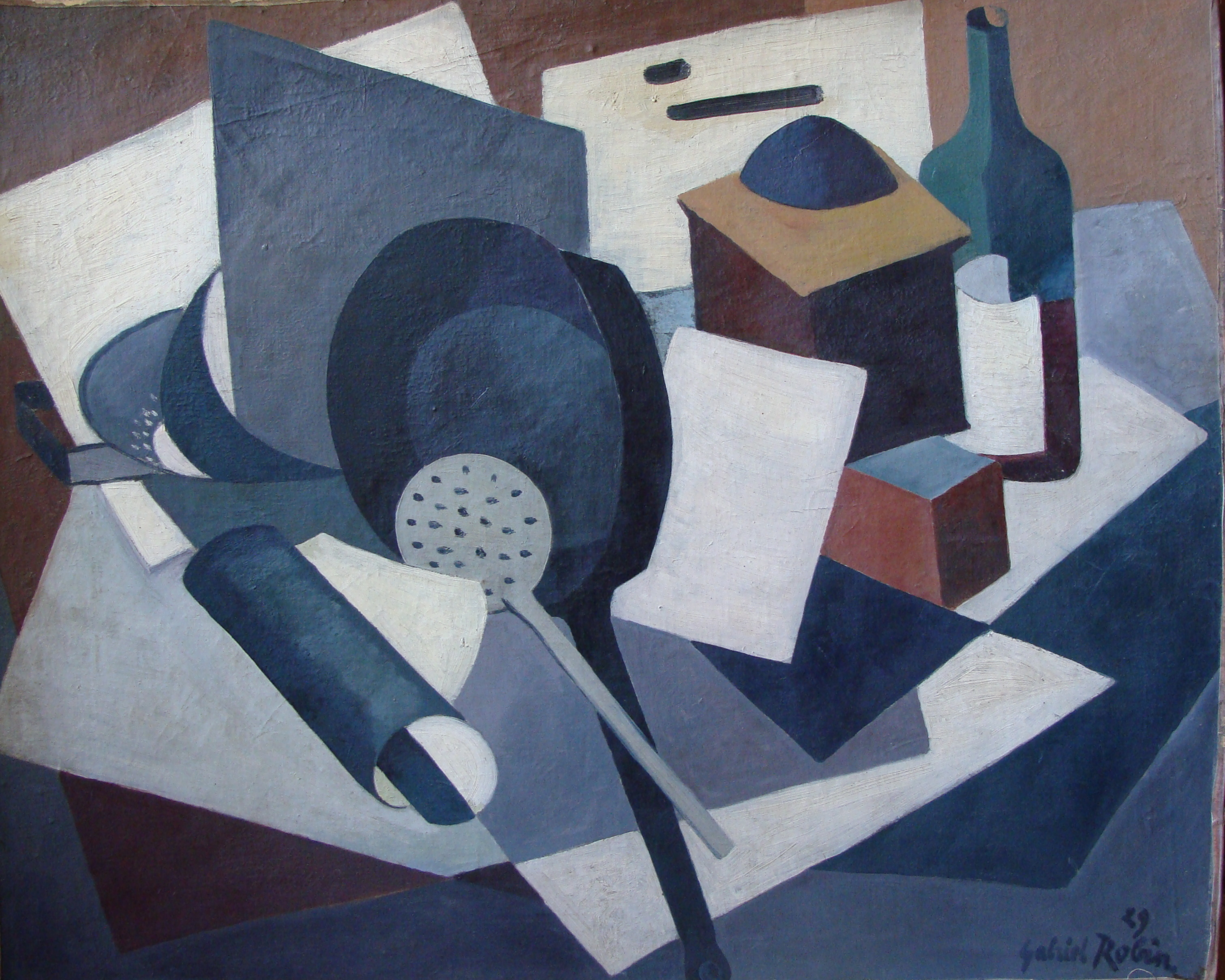
1929 - Le moulin à café (The coffee grinder)

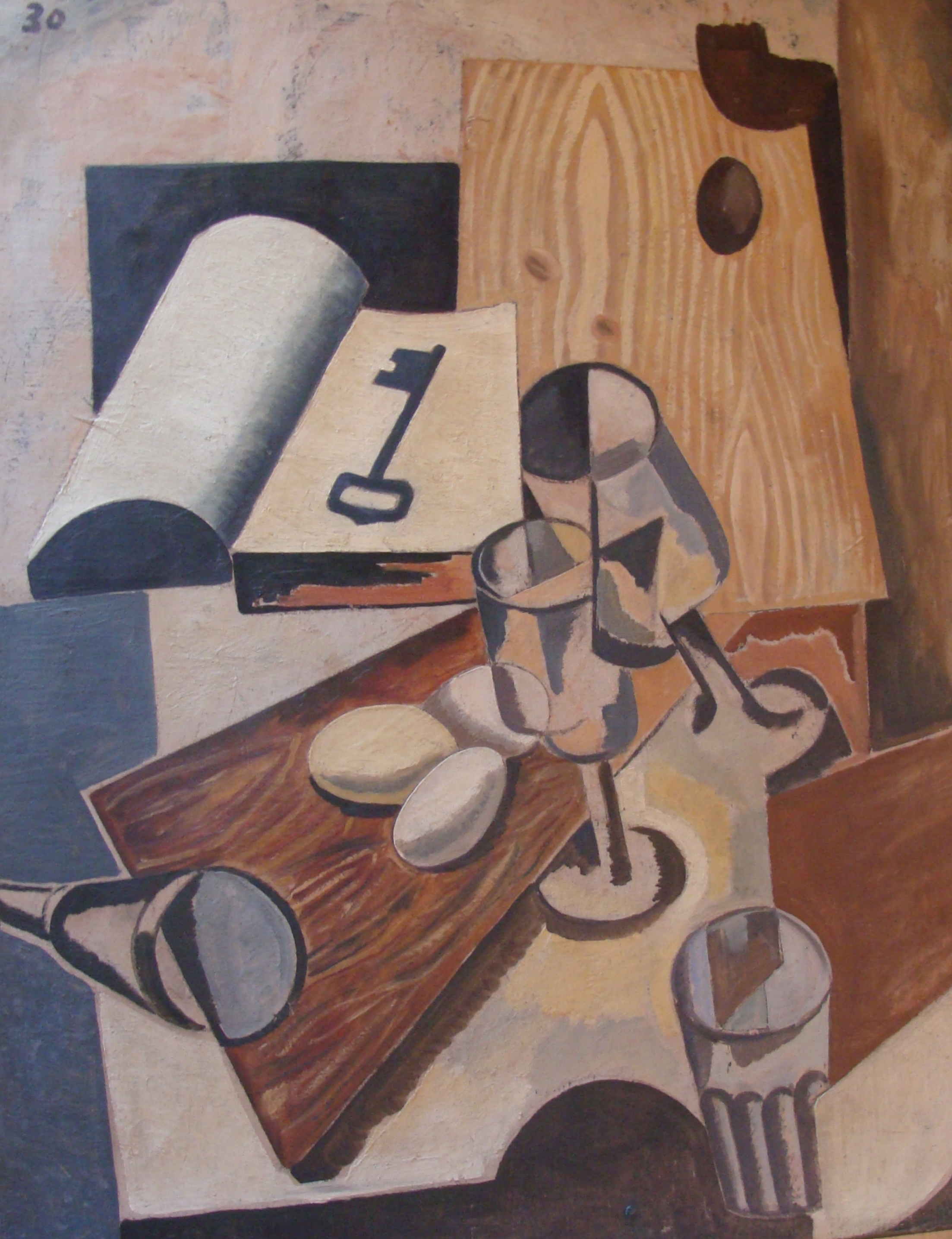
1930 - La palette et la clef (The pallet and the key)

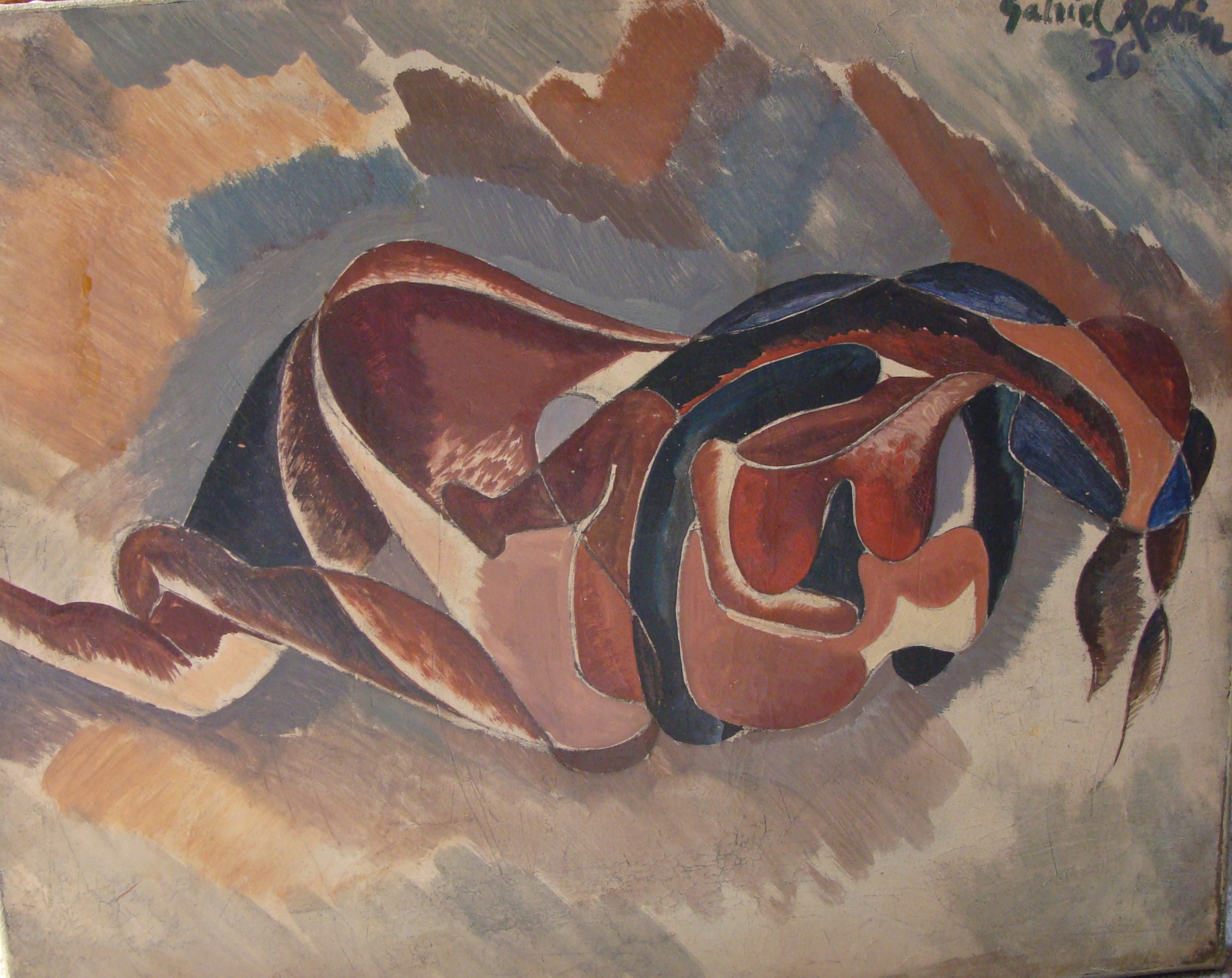
1936 - Maternité (Maternity)

It is in the early forties that he fully deployed his own style with human figures, landscapes and still life recreated in large colored scapes where the play of light – from violent glow to subtle chiaroscuro – gives birth to a space full of mysteries. These special lightings inspired by the works of Georges de La Tour give to his paintings a tragic constructive power which reveals the anxiety of the artist about his epoch and his contemporaries.

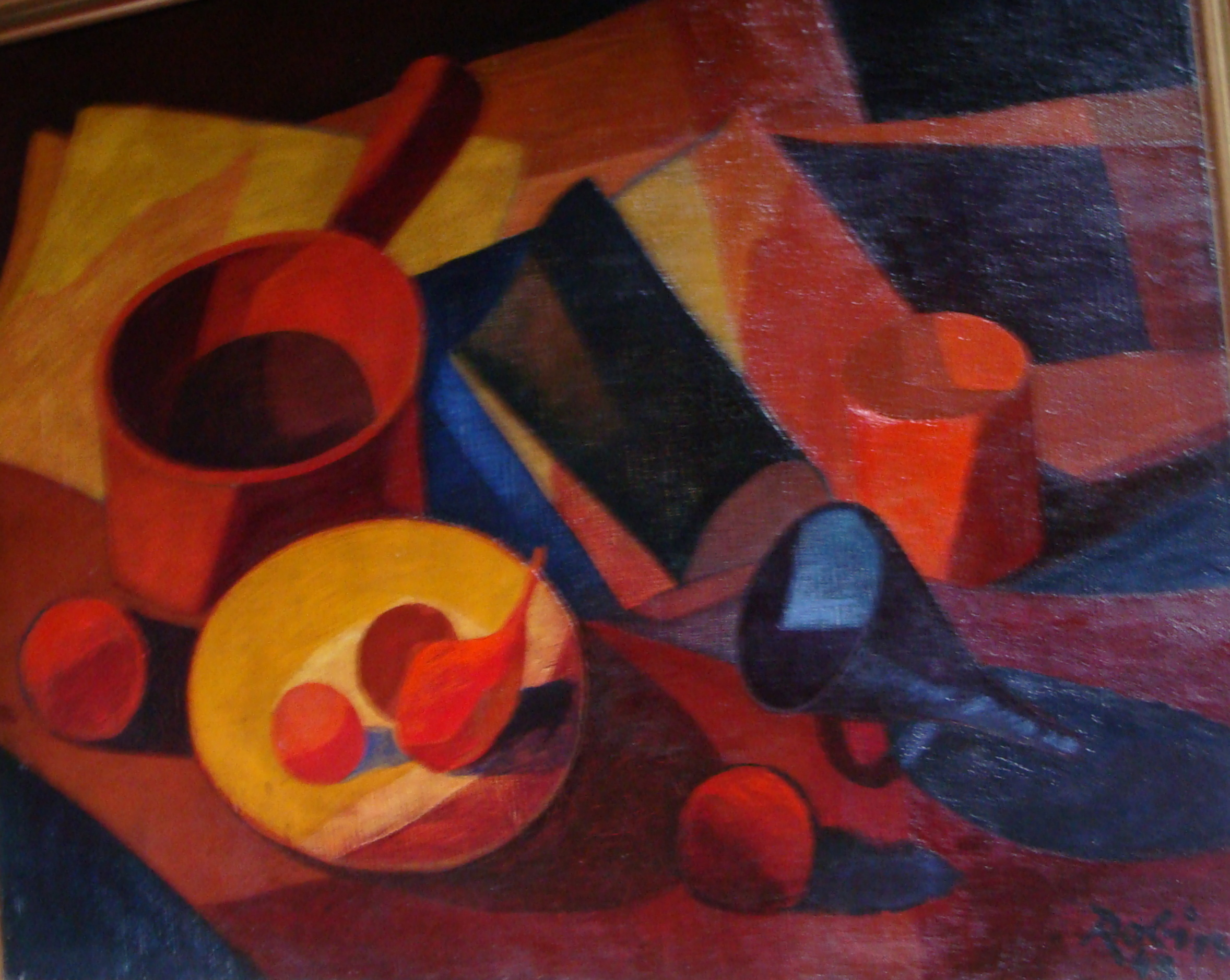
1943 - Le poêlon rouge (The red saucepan)

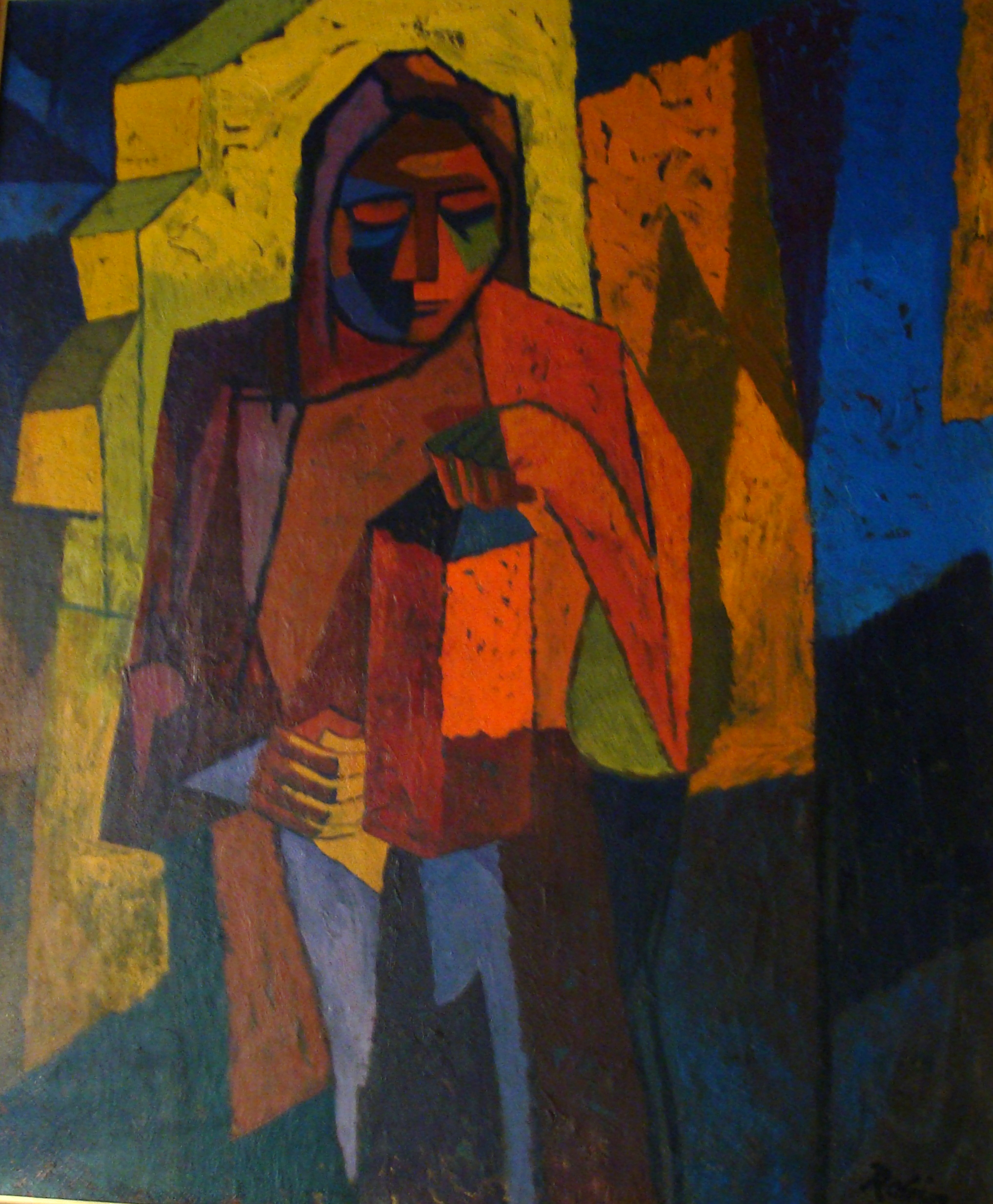
1944 - La femme à la lanterne (Woman with a lantern)

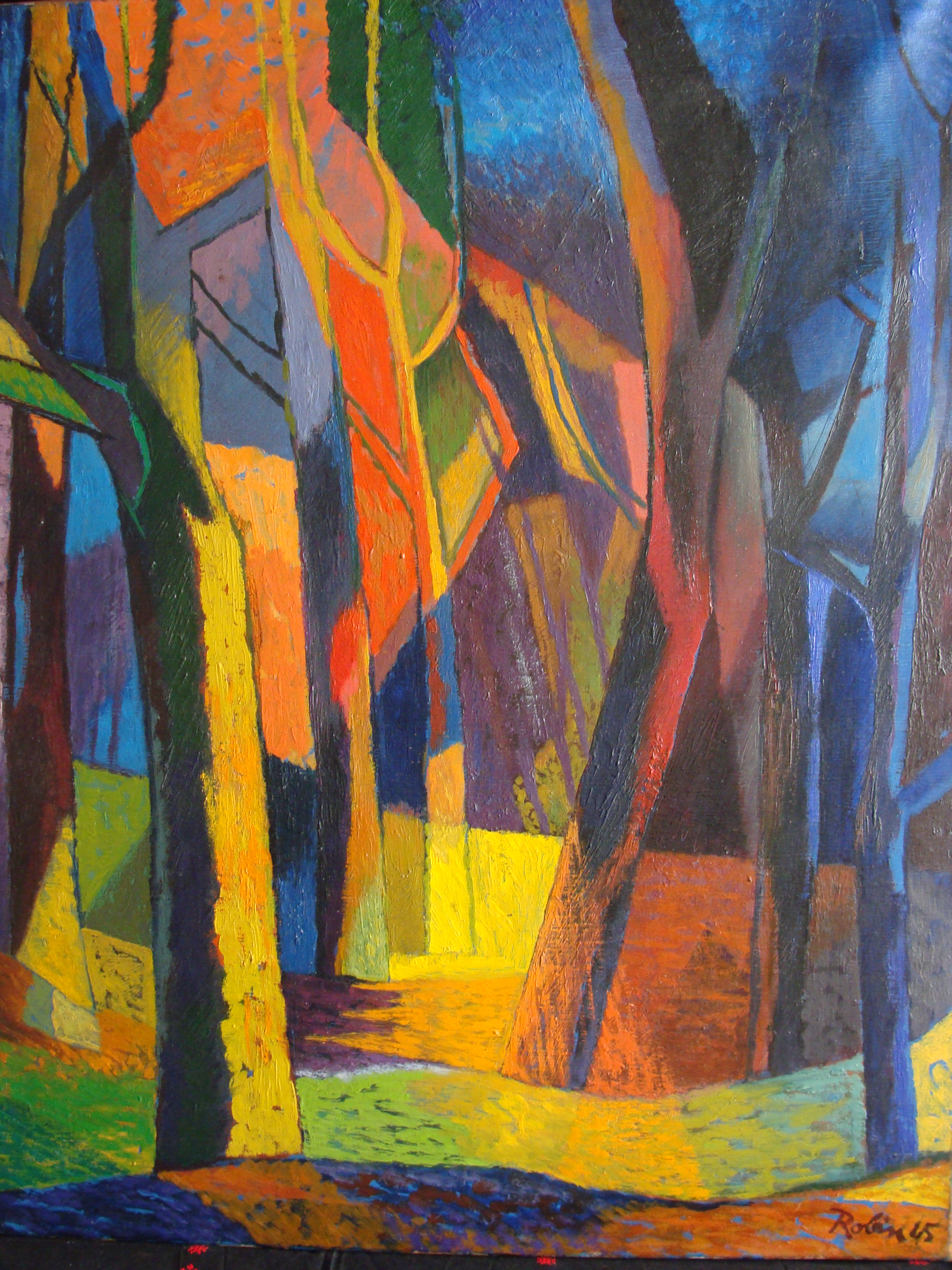
1945 - L'automne (Autumn)

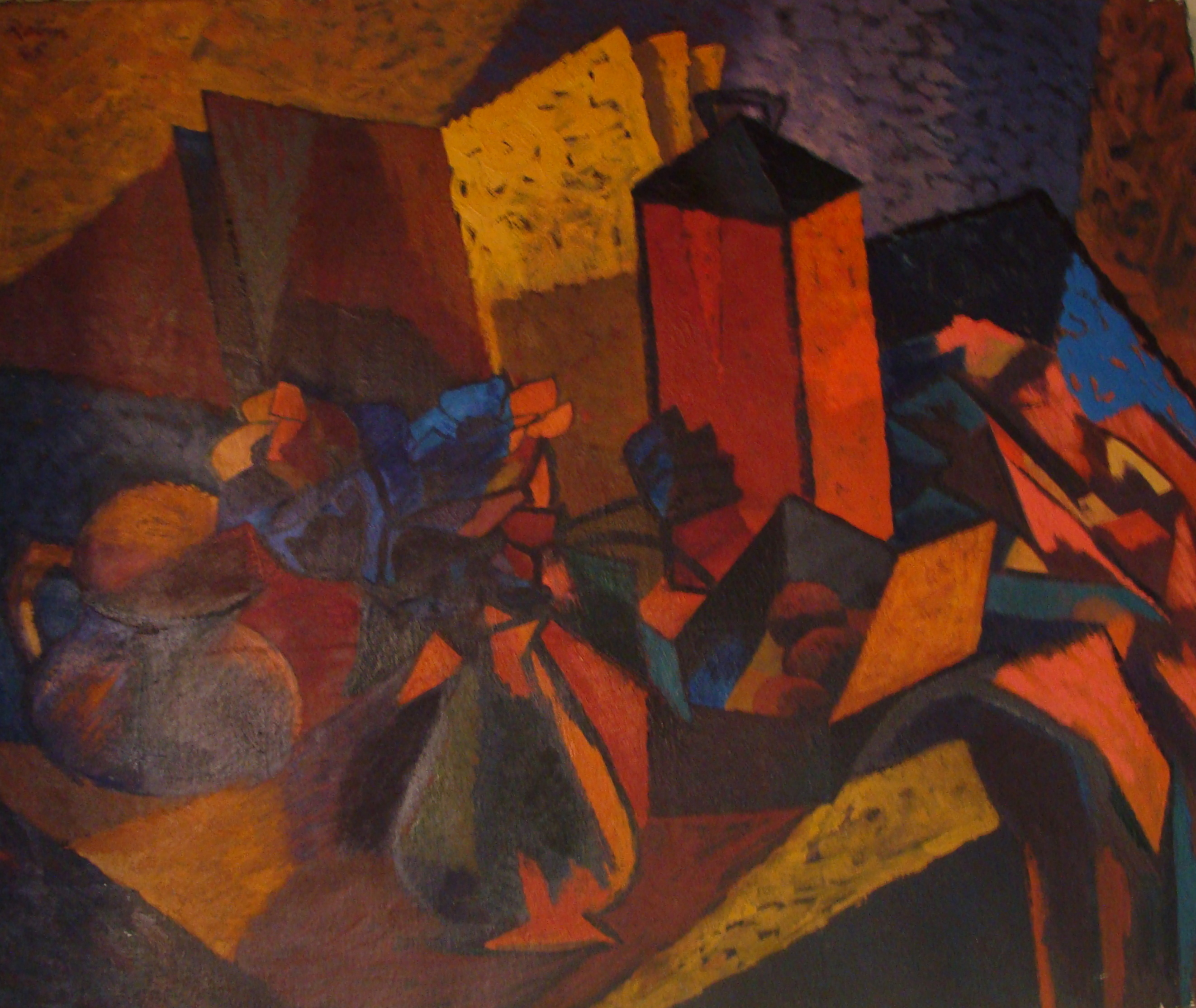
1945 - Les fleurs devant la lanterne (Flowers in front of a lantern)

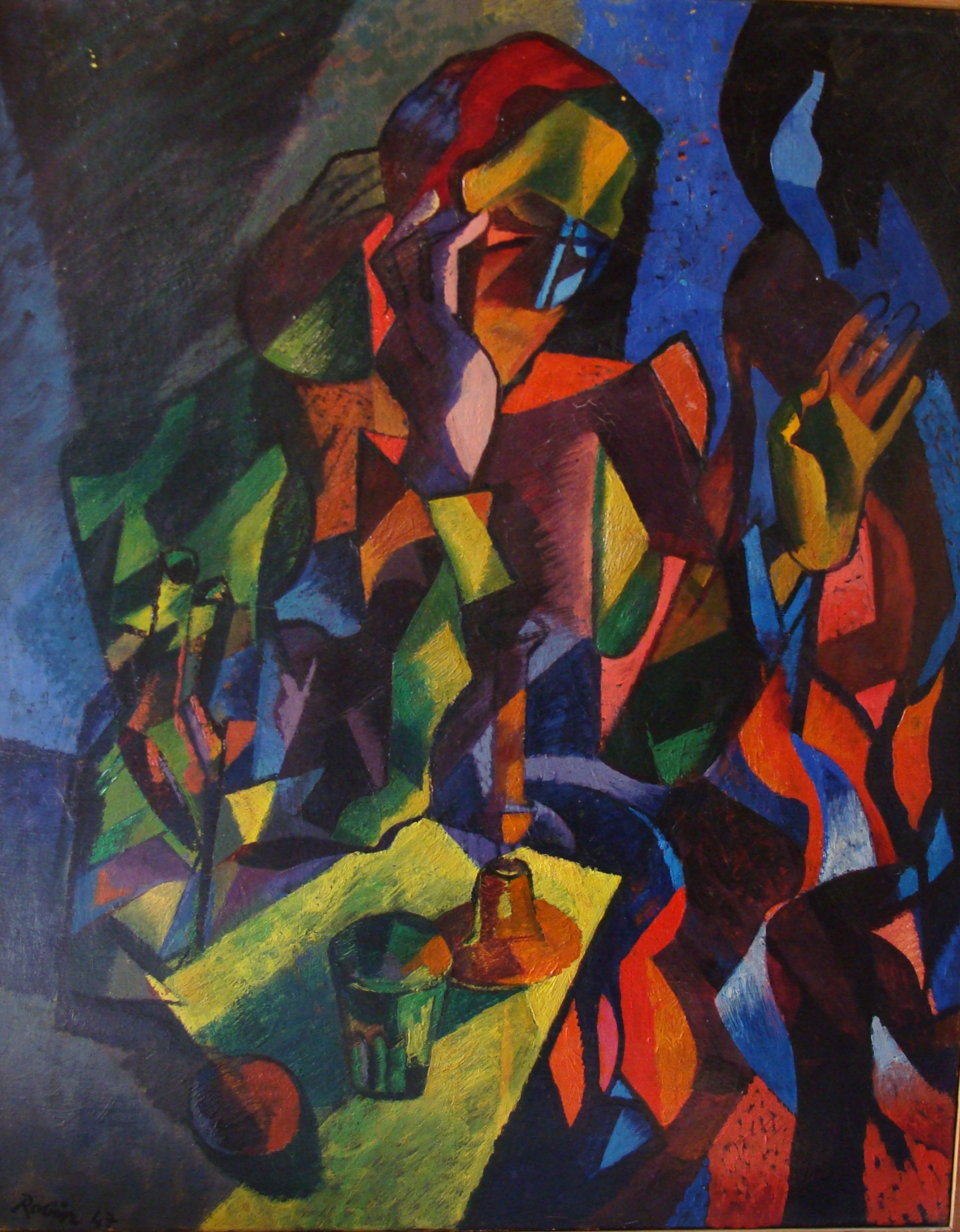
1947 - Le feu de bois (Wood fire)

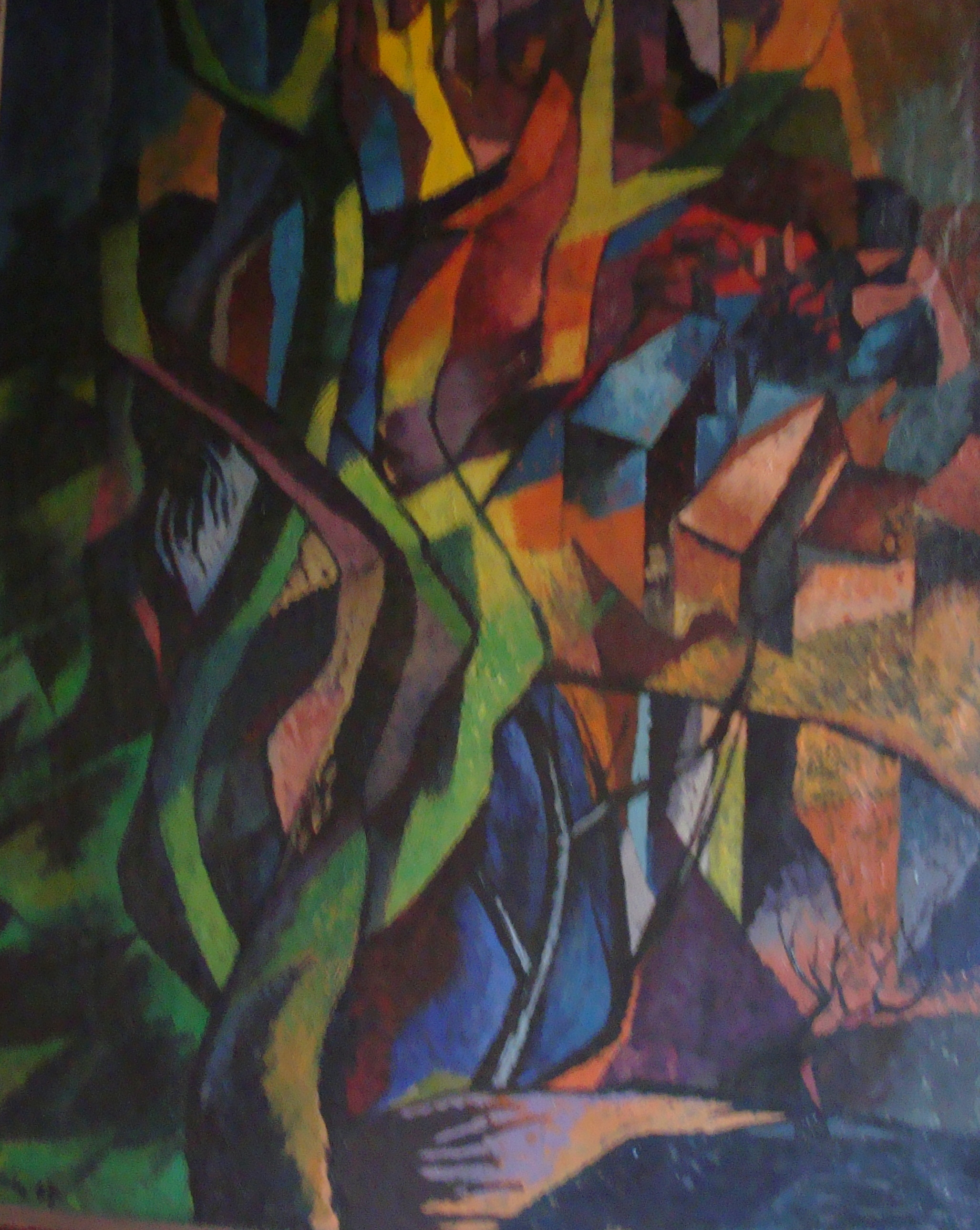
1947 - Le village derrière les arbres (The village behind the trees)

Beginning 1948, Robin turned to new stylistic research. His painting evolved towards movement and color. Now, violent tones in dancing flames and superimposed layers of dominate his work which has shifted towards a powerful lyric abstraction. His Terres chaudes and Terres froides (Warm lands and Cold lands, 1949 – 1961) are abstract landscapes which evoke terrible fires in the forest, storms and shipwrecks in oceans full of despair. The colors vibrate, move and inevitably material has to be used : he incorporates sand in his compositions.

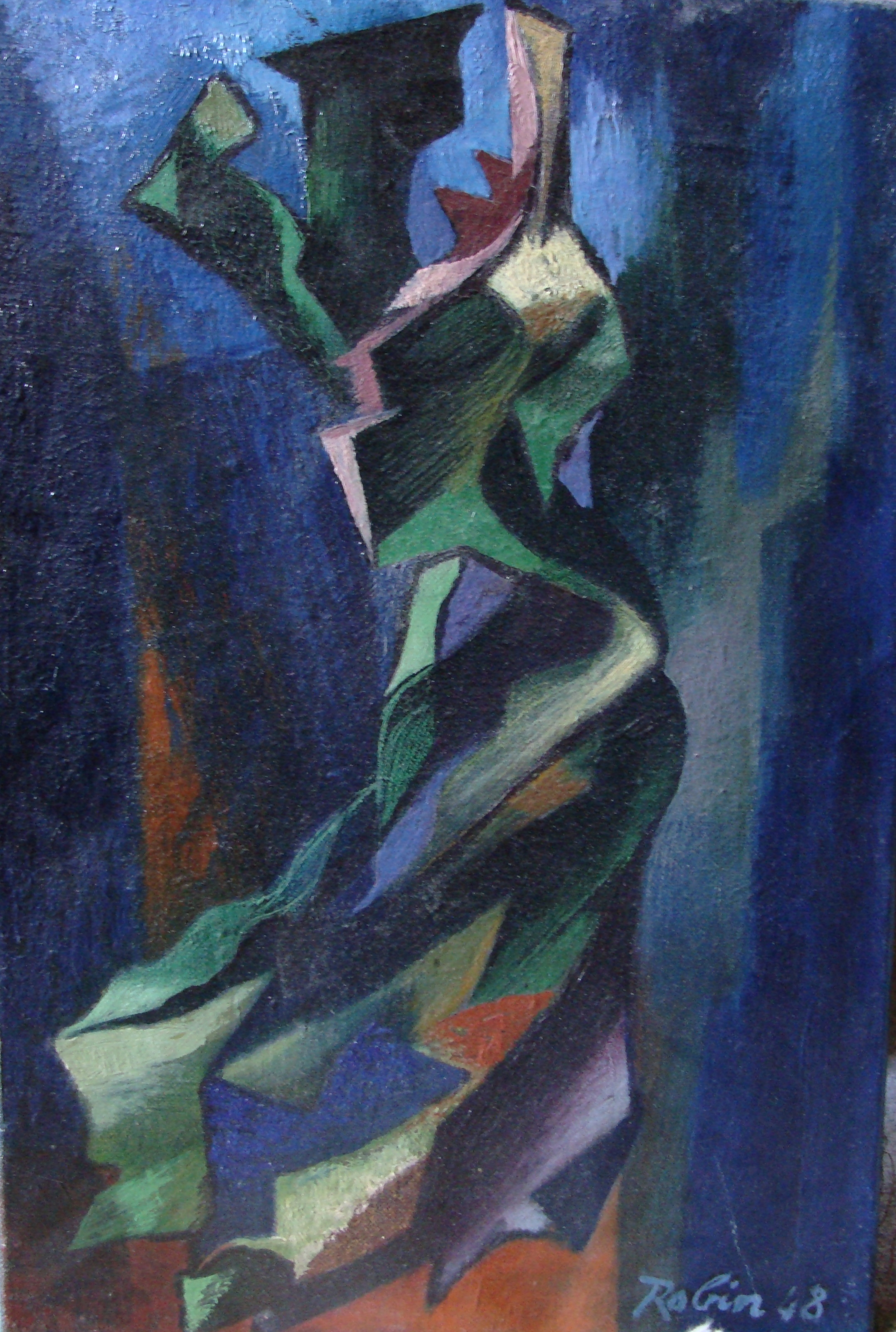
1948 - La robe au vent (The wind dress)

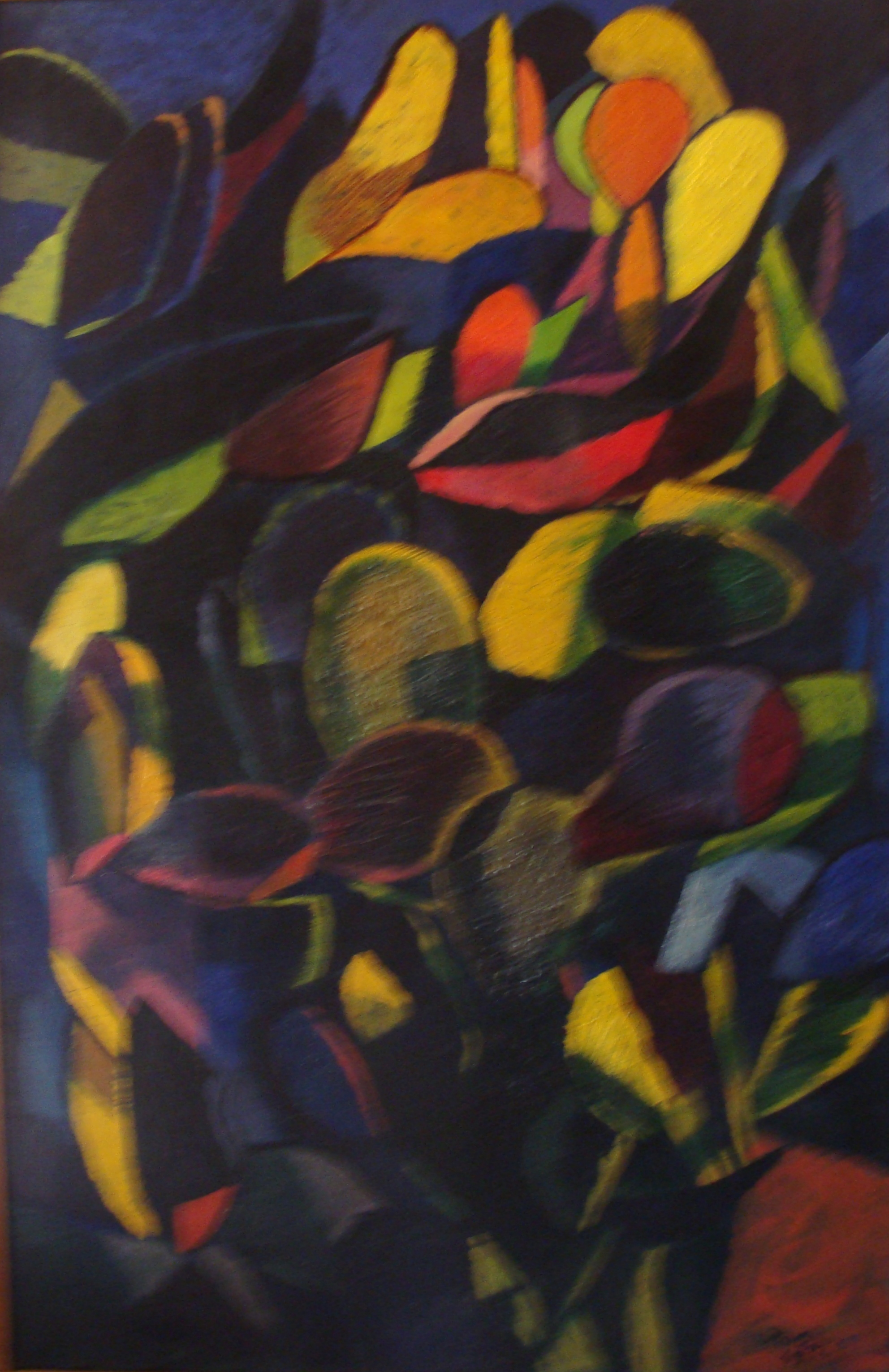
1949 - Terres chaudes : cactus (Warm lands: cactus)

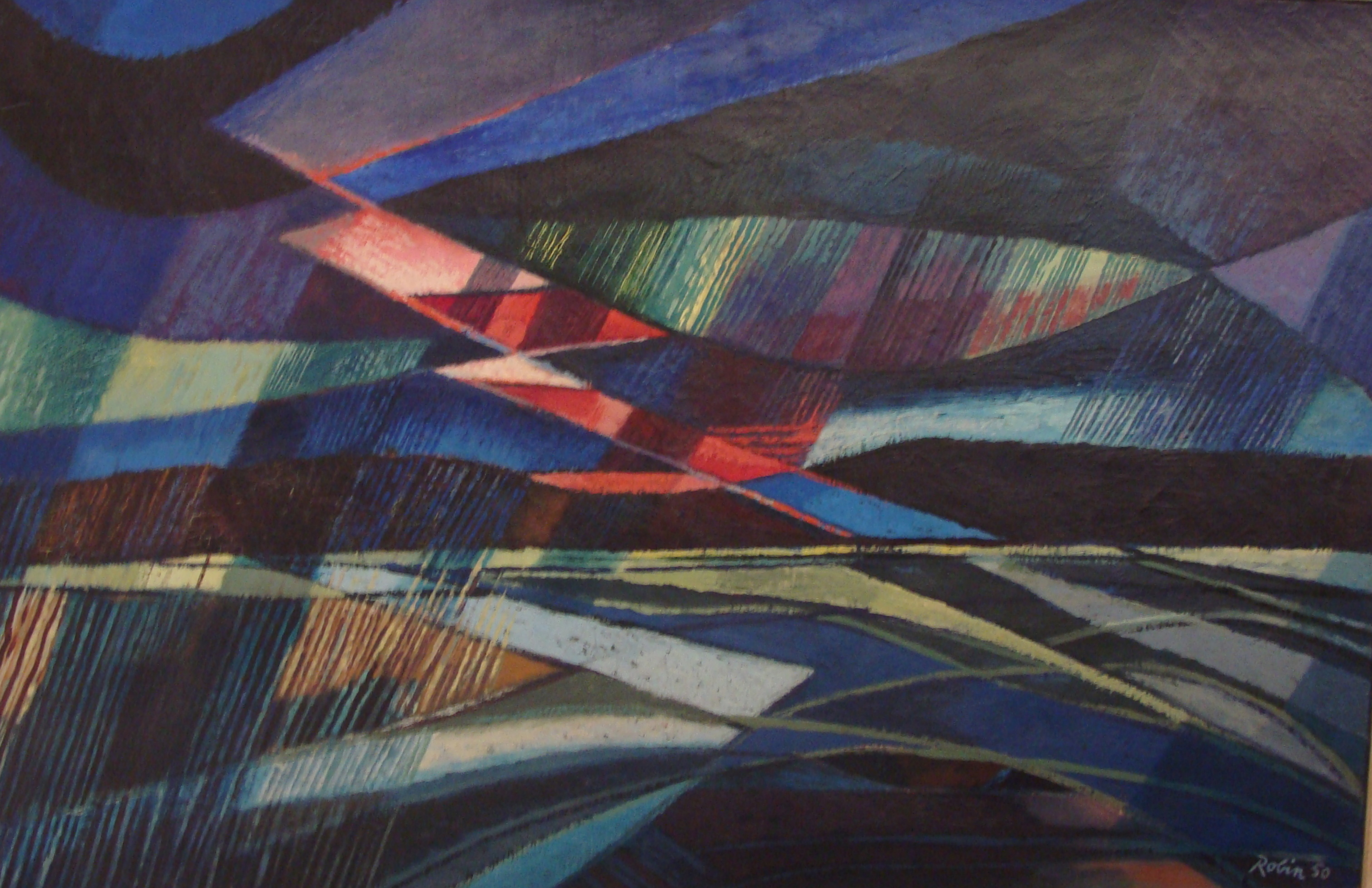
1950 - Terres froides, l'orage sur la plaine (Cold lands, thunderstorm on the plain)

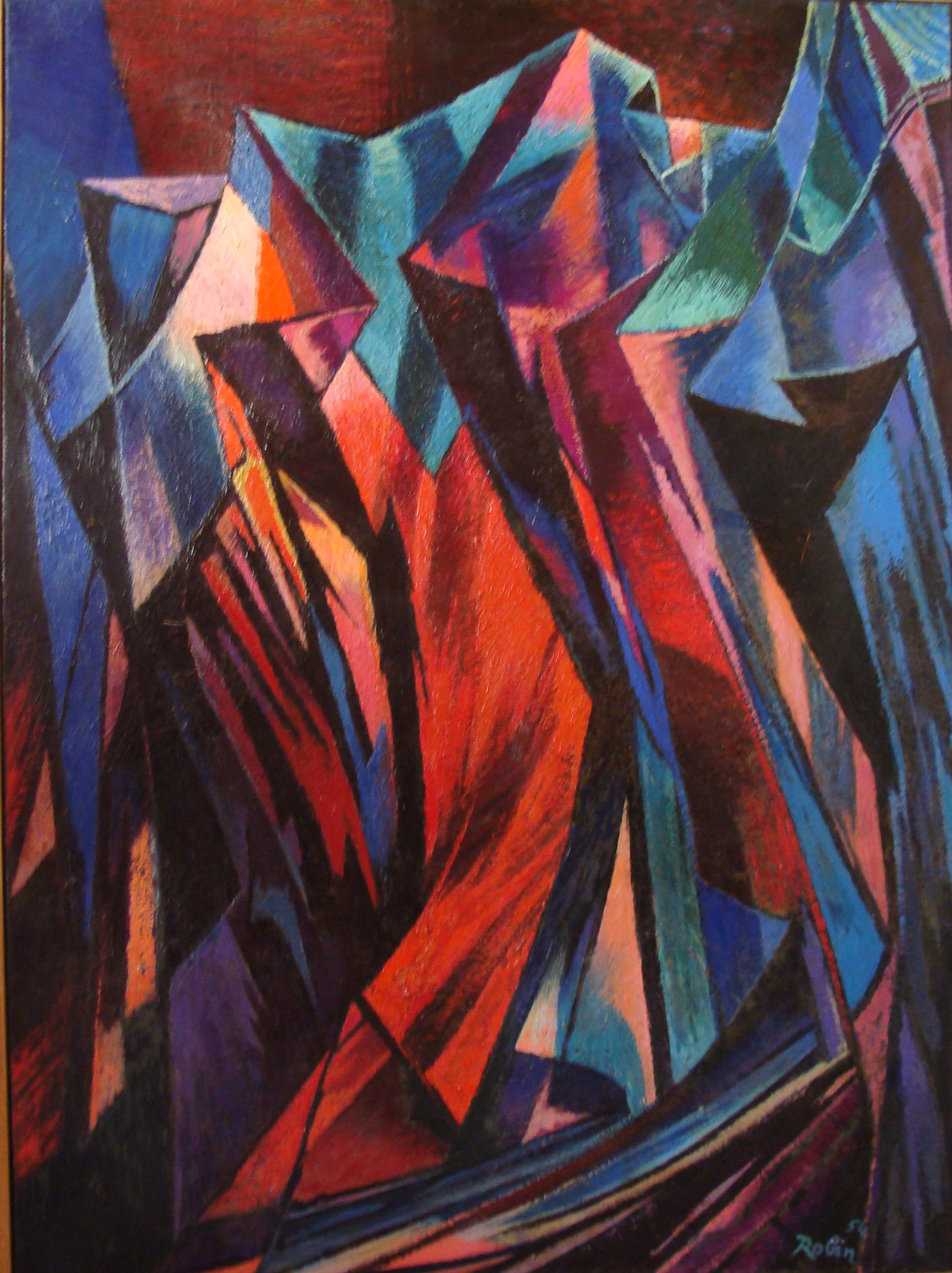
1954 - Terres froides : la grande paroi (Cold lands : the big wall)

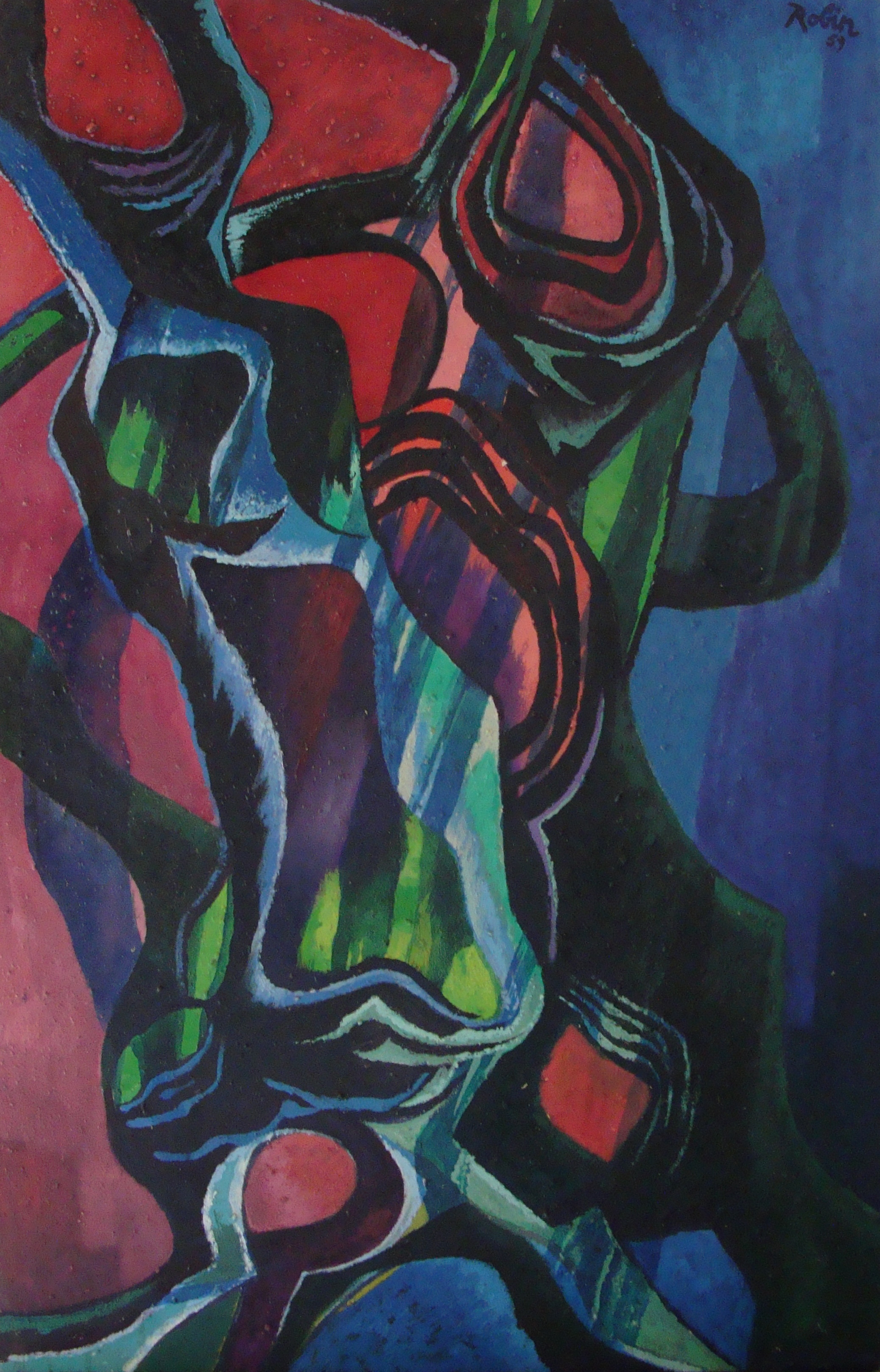
1959 - Les deux troncs d'arbre (The two tree trunks)

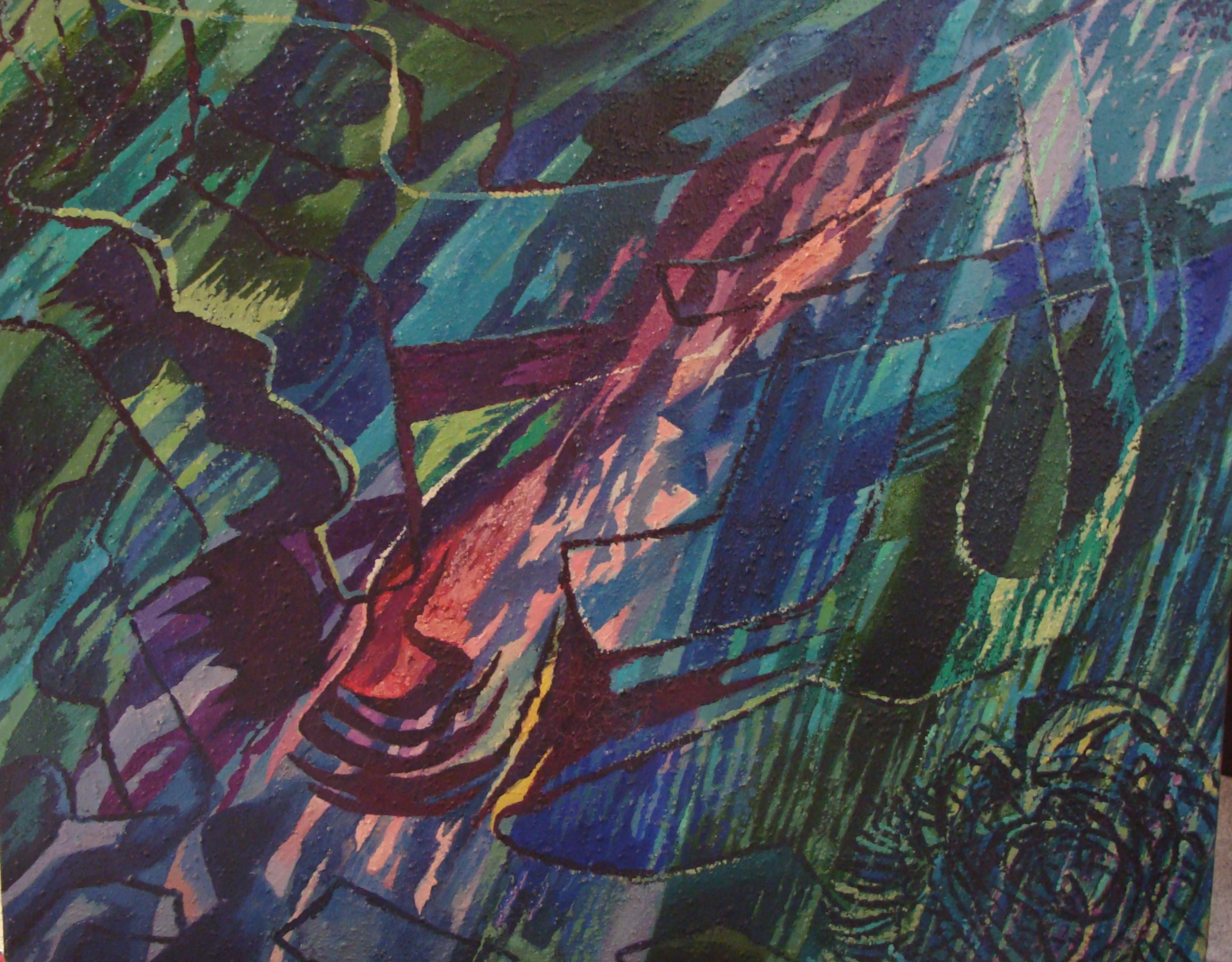
1961-1962 - L'orage dans la forêt (The storm in the forest)

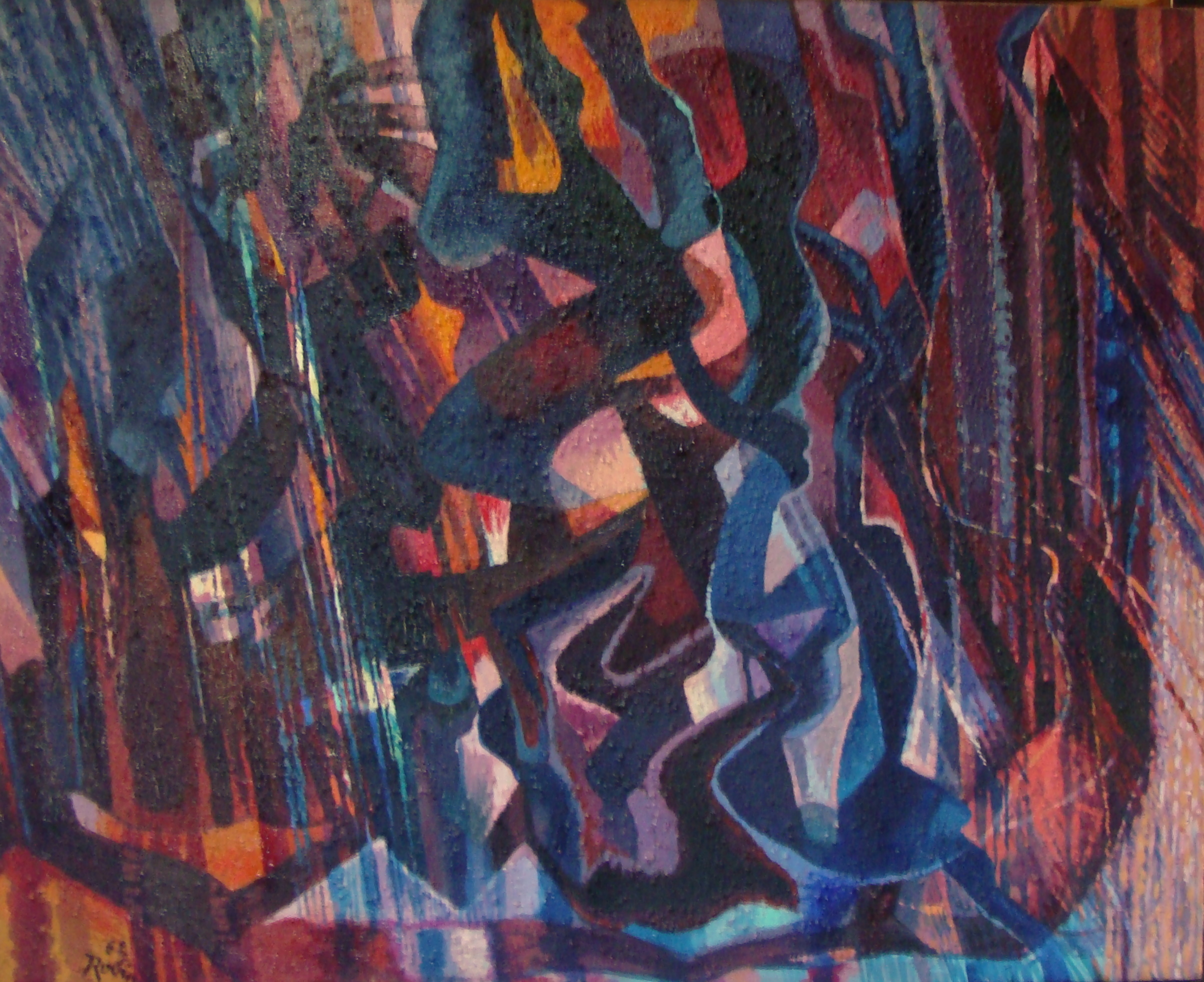
1962 - La forêt vierge 2 (The rainforest 2)

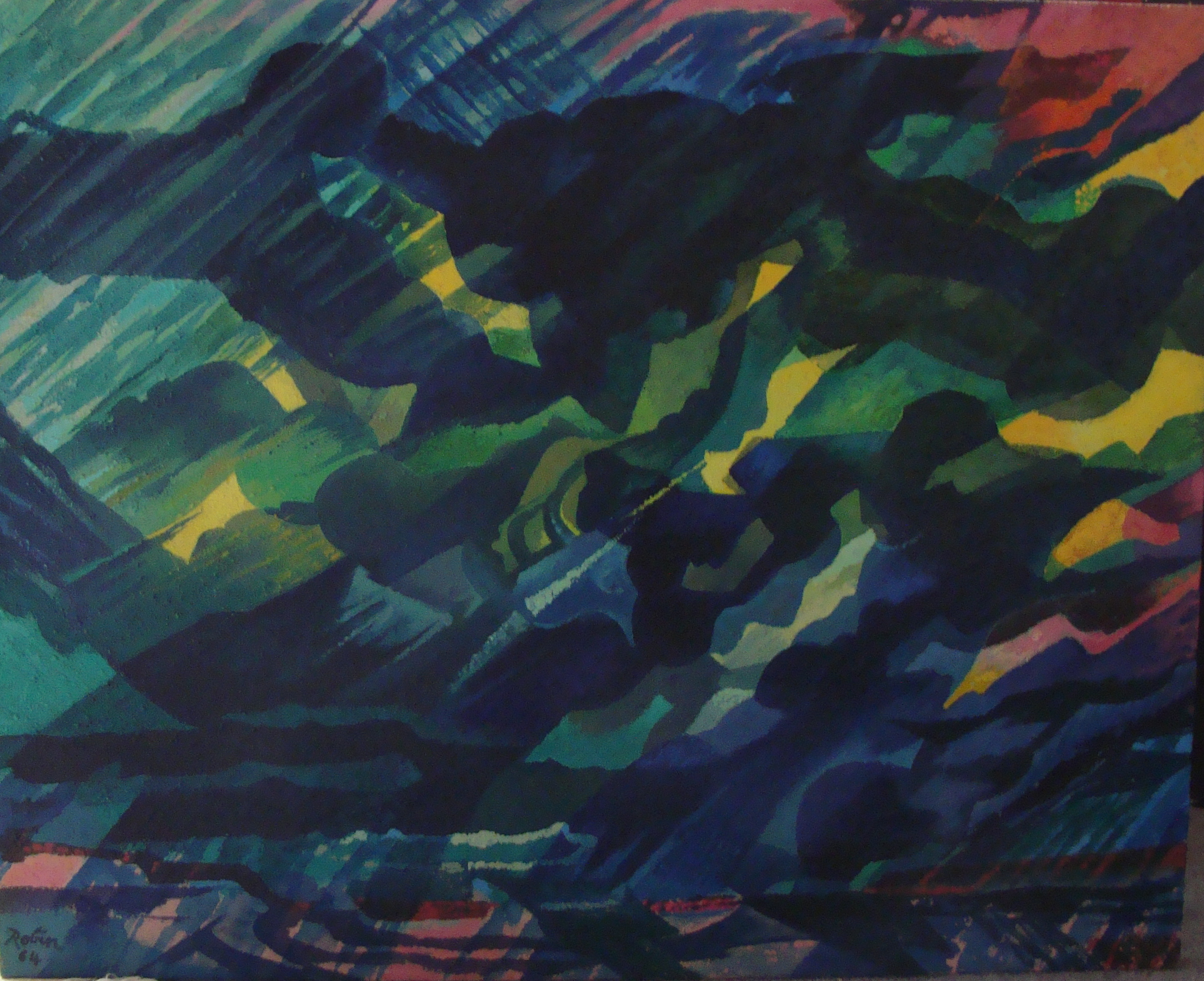
1964 - Un orage vert et jaune (A green and yellow storm)

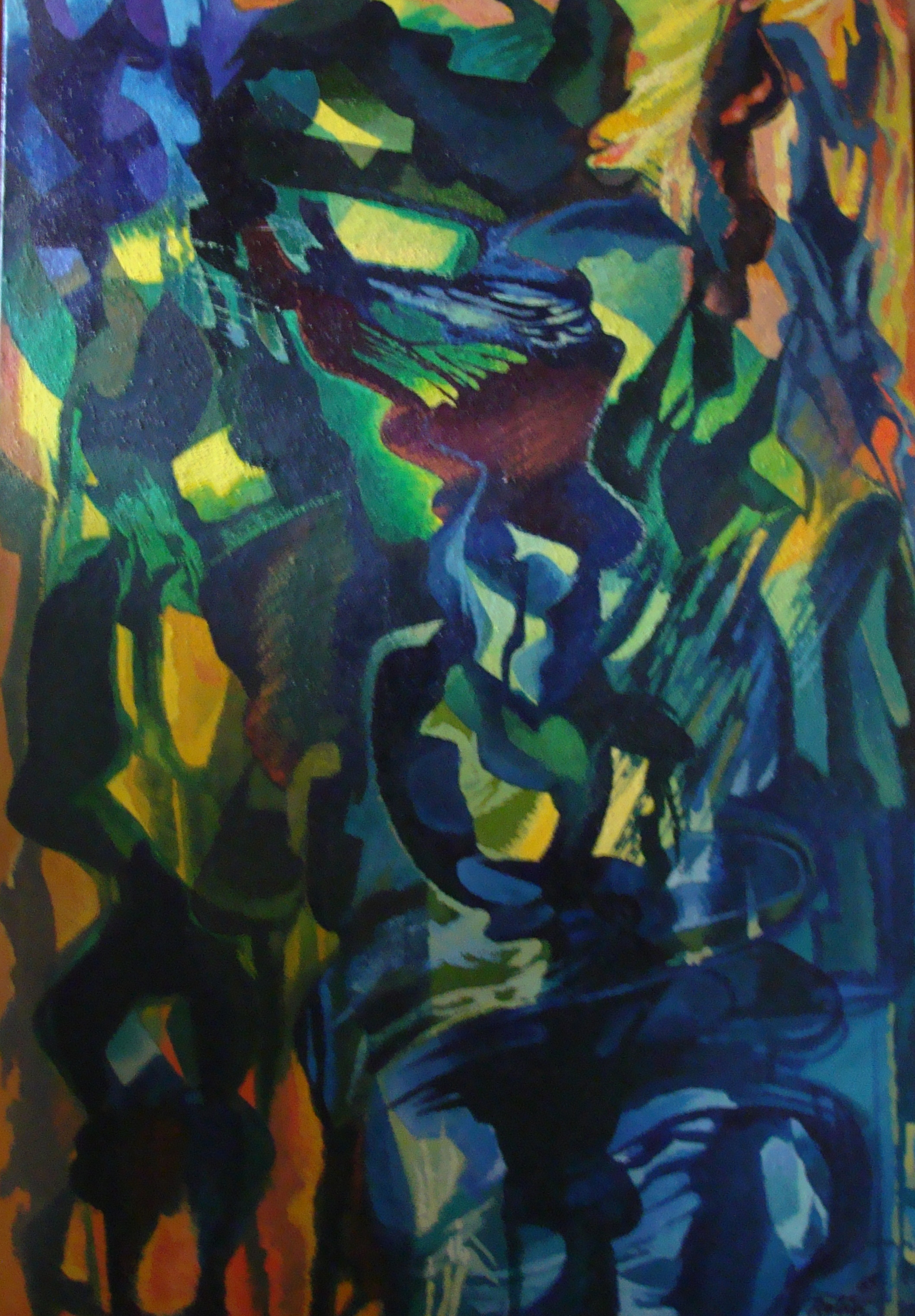
1965 - La forêt d'Amazonie (2) (The Amazon Forest (2))

From 1962 until 1969, Robin let color, light and form explode in a series of canvases dedicated to volcanoes (Etna, Niragongo).

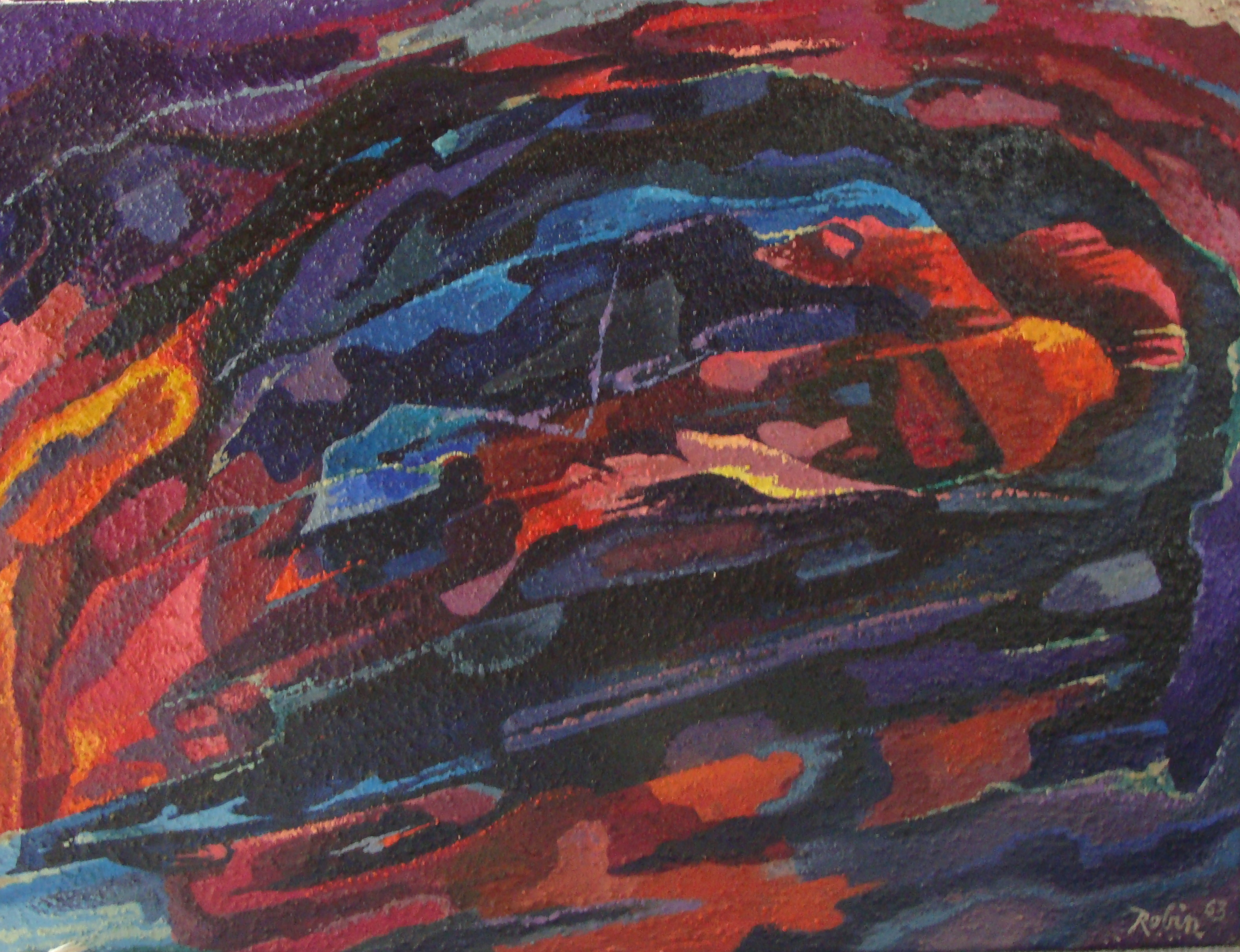
1963 - Esquisse 11 pour l'Etna (Sketch 11 for Etna)

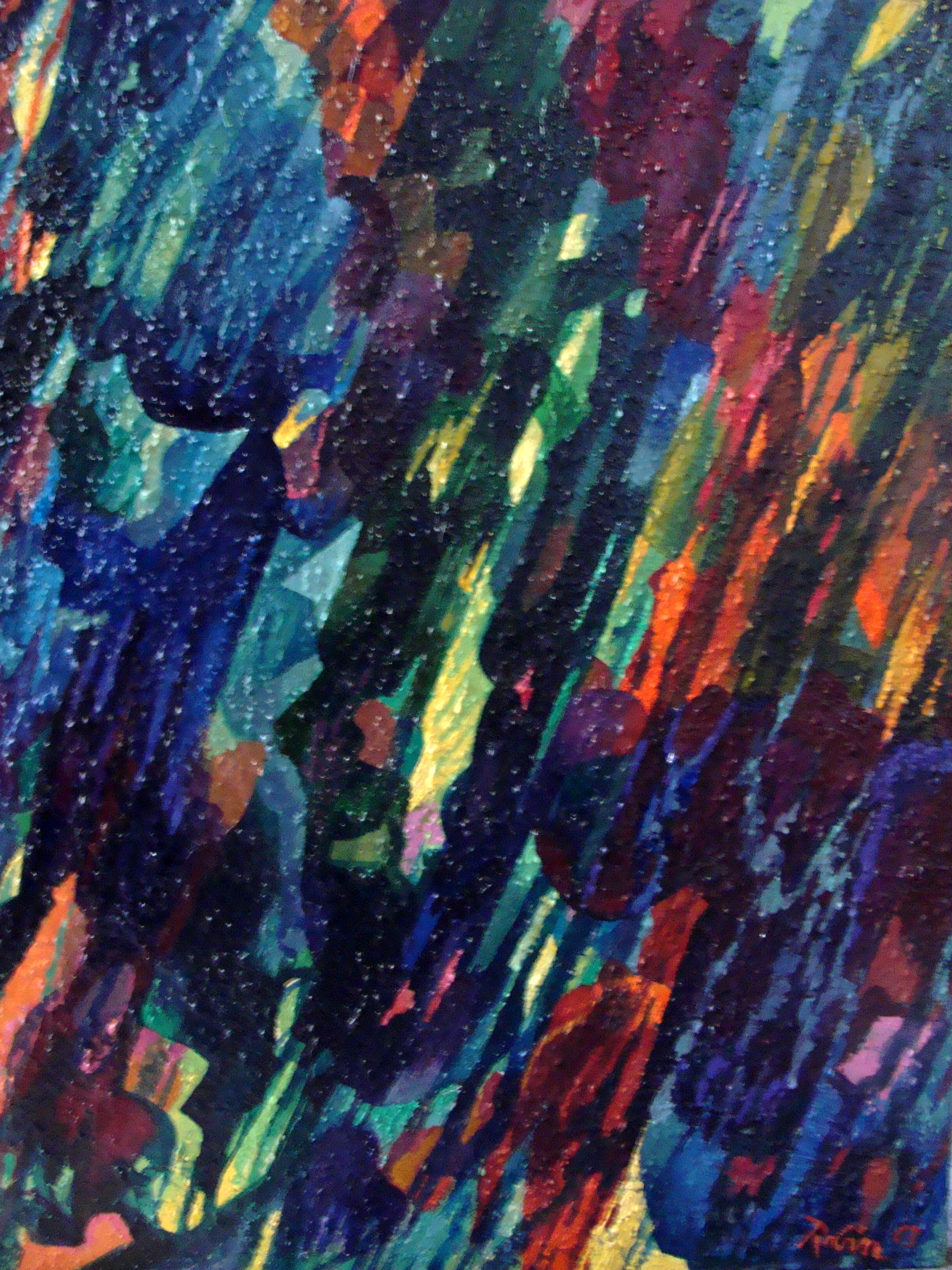
1963 - Série Etna, esquisse 13 : les fumerolles (Etna series, sketch 13 : fumaroles)

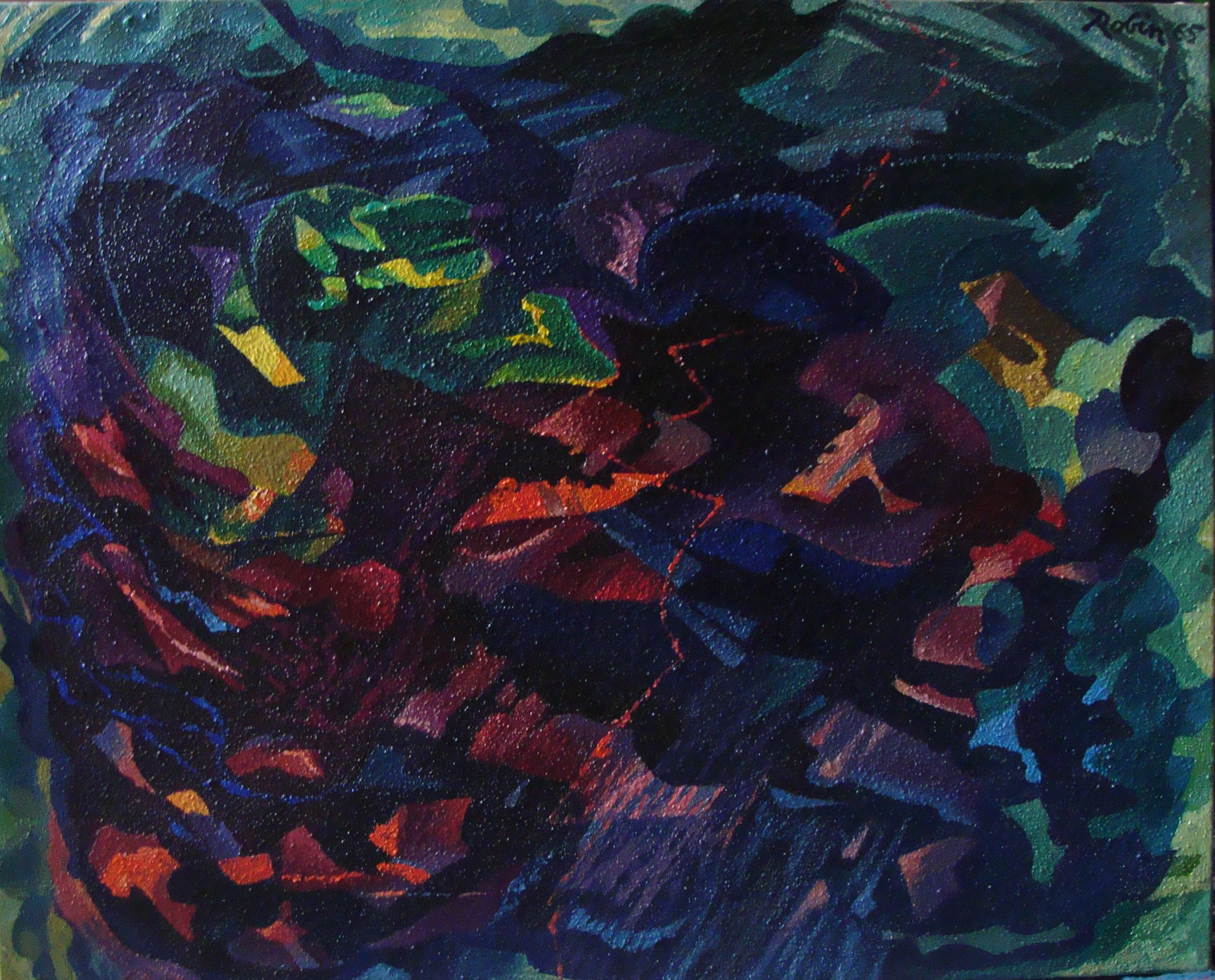
1965 - Etna 20 : la destruction de Catane (2) (the destruction of Catania)

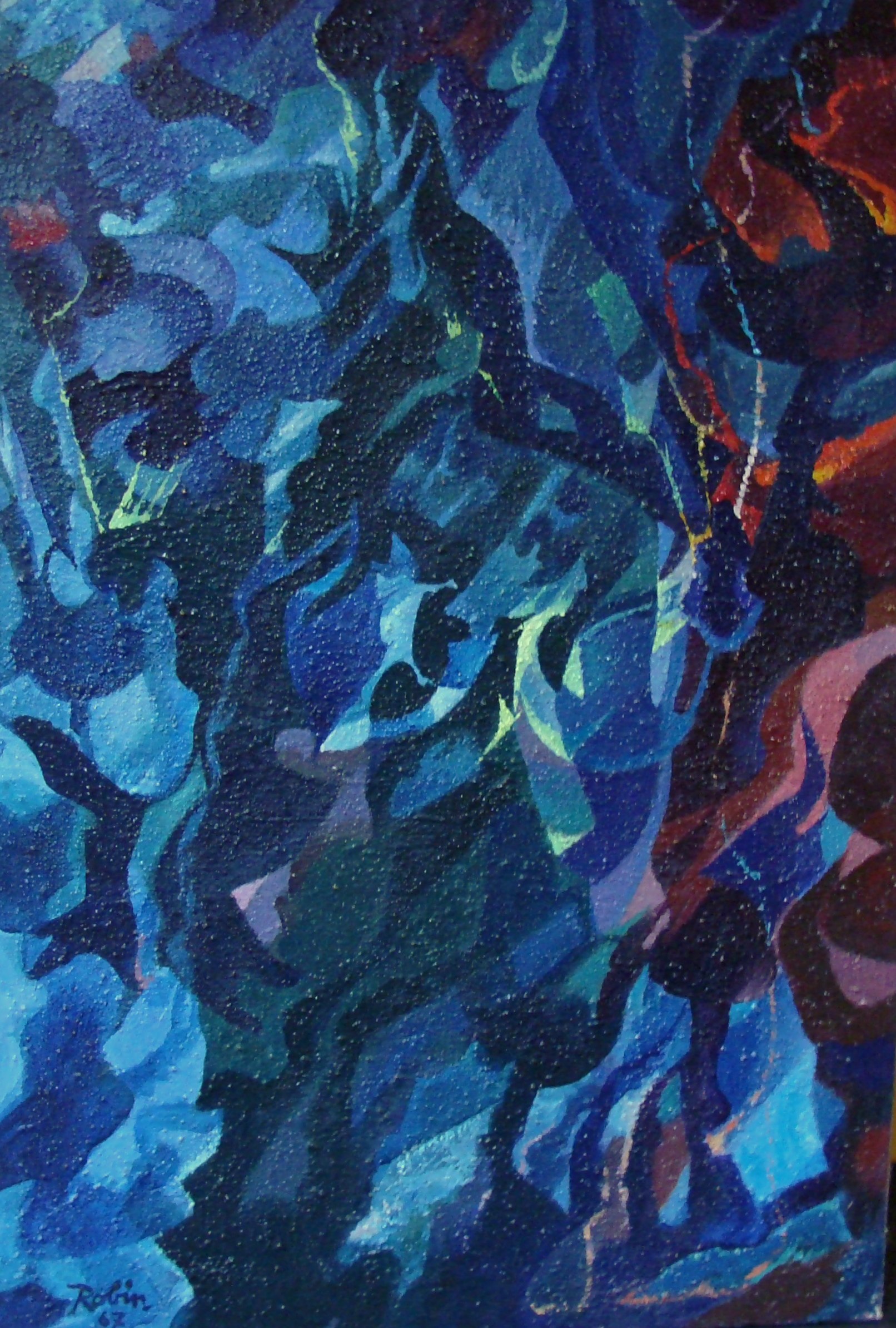
1967 - Le lac de lave du Niragongo, esquisse 5 (Lava lake of Niragongo, sketch 5)

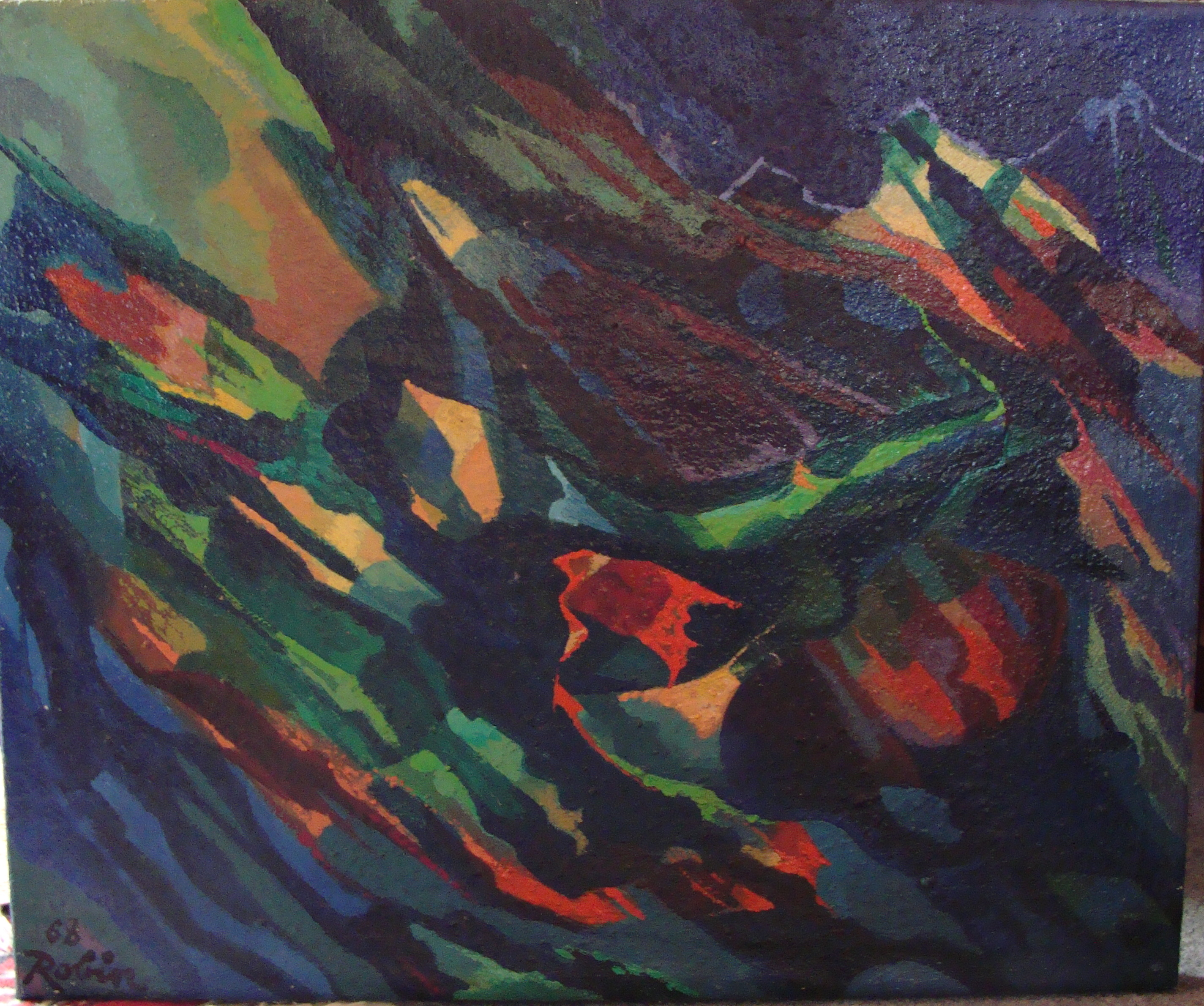
1968 - Série Etna, esquisse 22 : paysage près de l'Etna (Etna series, sketch 22: landscape near Etna)

Charcoal, red chalk, gouaches as well as costume projects are other facets of Gabriel Robin's talent.

== Museums ==
Works by Robin can be found at the Musée du Louvre, at the National Fund of Contemporary Art, the Museum of Fine Arts in Nantes, the Museum of Fine Arts in Ontario, Toronto (Canada), the National Art Gallery-Museum Alexander Soutzo in Athens (Greece) and in many private collections

== Bibliography ==
Source used for the writing of this article:

- Frédéric Ballesteros, Gabriel Robin, dans Lumières, Couleurs, Formes, Hôtel de Ville d'Aulnay-sous-Bois, 2008, p. 34-35

== See also ==
- École de Paris
