= Margarita González =

Margarita González may refer to:

- Margarita González Ontiveros (1918–2006), Mexican mezzo-soprano and contralto
- Margarita González Saravia (born 1956), Mexican politician, governor of Morelos since 2024
