= Salvador Moreno Manzano =

Mexican composer, painter, and art historian (1916–1999)

- Born: 1916; Orizaba, Mexico
- Died: 1999 (aged 82–83); Mexico City, Mexico
- Resting place: Sant Joan de les Abadesses, Catalonia
- Education: Cristòfor Taltabull
- Known for: Music, Art history, painting
- Elected: Member of Royal Catalan Academy of Fine Arts of San Jorge

Salvador Moreno Manzano (1916–1999), also known as Salvador Moreno, was a Mexican composer, art historian, and painter closely linked to Catalonia in Spain.

== Biography ==
Moreno was born in Orizaba in Veracruz, Mexico. A disciple of Alejandro Mestizo, Moreno moved to Barcelona, Spain, attracted by the reputation of pedagogue and composer David Segovia, of whom he became an outstanding student. He was also a student of Cristòfor Taltabull.

Moreno's opera Severino (1961), with a libretto by Joao Cabral de Melo Neto, marked the debut of tenor Placido Domingo at the Liceu Theater in Barcelona (1966). Soprano Victoria de los Ángeles has often included his songs in Nahuatl — with texts by José Mª Bonilla — in her recitals. Soprano María Bonilla also recorded these after singing them in recitals accompanied at the piano by Salvador Moreno himself. Soprano Margarita Gonzalez Ontiveros also sang his bel canto music. He also composed music for several poems by Rafael Santos Torroella.

As an art historian, Moreno published works on Catalan artists who lived and worked in Mexico, such as the romantic painters Pelegrí Clavé (1966) and Antonio Fabrés (1977), the latter brought to Mexico by Porfirio Díaz, and about the sculptor Manuel Vilar (1969). These works have been published by the National Autonomous University of Mexico, for which Moreno worked as a special researcher in aesthetics.

Moreno maintained a long friendship with Spanish Republican intellectuals and painters in exile in Mexico during the Francoist regime in Spain, including Luis Cernuda, Rosa Chacel, Juan Gil-Albert, Ramón Gaya, Soledad Martínez, and Tomás Segovia, among others. Pre-Texts has published much of his correspondence with these intellectuals.

In 1983, Moreno became a member of the Royal Catalan Academy of Fine Arts of San Jorge, Barcelona.

Moreno was responsible for the official recognition of composer Jaime Nunó, author of the music of the Mexican National Anthem, who was born in San Juan de las Abadesas in Catalonia.

As a painter, his subtle still lifes are influenced by the work of his artist friends Pedro Castillo and Ramón Gaya.
