= Pedro Flores García =

Spanish painter

Pedro Flores García (Note: In this Spanish name, the first or paternal surname is Flores and the second or maternal family name is García.) (5 February 1897 – 8 October 1967) was a painter of the Region of Murcia, Spain.

== Childhood and youth ==
He was born in Murcia on 5 February 1897, in a humble family. During his childhood he studied at a Marist school and the Jesuit school, but at ten years old began working as an apprentice in a decorative paint shop. In 1908 he began attending classes at the Academy of Fine Arts at the Royal Economic Society of Friends of the Country and then continued in the Art's school. Later, he began working in a lithographic factory with Luis Garay, where he learned some photographic techniques. He used photographs taken near the orchards of Murcia as inspiration. He soon obtained several awards with his paintings in 1927 and obtained a great appreciation of criticism in the exhibition conducted by Ramón Gaya and Luis Garay in Galeries Dalmau Barcelona.

== His stay in Paris ==
In 1928, he received a grant to continue his studies of art in Paris. He moved to the French capital and lived there for over five years. He returned to Madrid for a short period in 1933, but soon moved to Barcelona to teach drawing at the Balmes Institute. At the end of the Spanish Civil War he returned to Paris and became part of the so-called Spanish School of Paris, which included other painters such as Pablo Picasso, Ginés Parra, Francisco Bores, Antoni Clavé, etc. He did most of his work in his study off Montparnasse, in addition to his paintings artwork, he also made tapestries and staging grounds. For a short period, he returned to Murcia in 1962 to decorate the dome of the Sanctuary of Fuensanta. Later, having completed the work, he returned to Paris, where he died in 1967.

== His work ==
His style was avant-garde, using a geometry of shapes and planes, with thick strokes to define the shape and strengthen the composition, using colors and painting on various media such as oil paintings, etchings, illustrations and stage designs.

Some of his works in chronological order are:

- 1916 Portrait of Josefina Flores Borja
- 1920 Plaza Belluga, Selfportrait with vest, with palm trees and Landscape Portrait of Matthew
- 1925 hope, holy Bodegón, Dalias and books, winter morning, with bottle Bodegón Selfportrait with black hat.
- 1926 Midwife's Almudí, Garden of cypress trees, orchard and Homage to Gaya.
- 1927 Selfportrait.
- 1929 portrait of Antonia, and Torero maja, Harlequin and Columbine, Notre Dame, Women and Women with children inside.
- 1930 Rue Galand, Two Figures, Harlequin and his son, Le Marché Rue Mouffetard and Montebello.
- 1931 Lady.
- 1935 Portrait of Women and Pedro seated.
- 1937 Portrait of Antonio.
- 1938 portrait of his son Antonio.
- 1940 The dandy.
- 1942 Harlequin, Still Life with chair and table with still life and scissors.
- 1943 Still Life Still Life with fruit and with rooster.
- 1945 Desnudo.
- 1946 Still Life and Portrait.
- 1947 Breton Landscape.
- 1950 Maja and bullfighter Portrait Funes Carlos Ruiz.
- 1962 Mural Decoration of the Sanctuary of Fuensanta.

Although most of his work is in private collections, some of his work can be seen in: Centre Georges Pompidou in Paris, Museo Nacional Centro de Arte Reina Sofía in Madrid, National Museum of Prague, Buenos Aires Museum of Modern Art, Puerto Rico Museum of Art, MACCSI in Caracas, Modern Art and Contemporary Art Museum in Nice, Modern Art Museum in Céret, MNAC in Barcelona and Fine Art Museum of Murcia.
