= Francisco Bores =

Spanish painter (1898–1972)

Francisco Bores (Madrid, May 6, 1898 – Paris, May 10, 1972) was an important figure of twentieth-century European art. His presence was important among the second wave of Spanish artists who arrived in Paris in the 1920s, which also included Pablo Picasso, Ginés Parra, Pedro Flores, Antoni Clavé; although in his own country he was not really recognized until well into the 1970s, when aspects of his work that did not fit in with the dominant informalism and social realism were finally valued.

The style of Bores was forged following his close contact with the greatest painters of the first vanguard: Pablo Picasso and Henri Matisse. He admired their manner of constructing forms, classicism, and later the cubist explosion. Bores harmonizes these influences in his work, and goes beyond them. His artworks are showcased at the Museo de Arte Contemporáneo in Madrid.
