= Ramón Gaya =

Spanish artist (1910–2005)

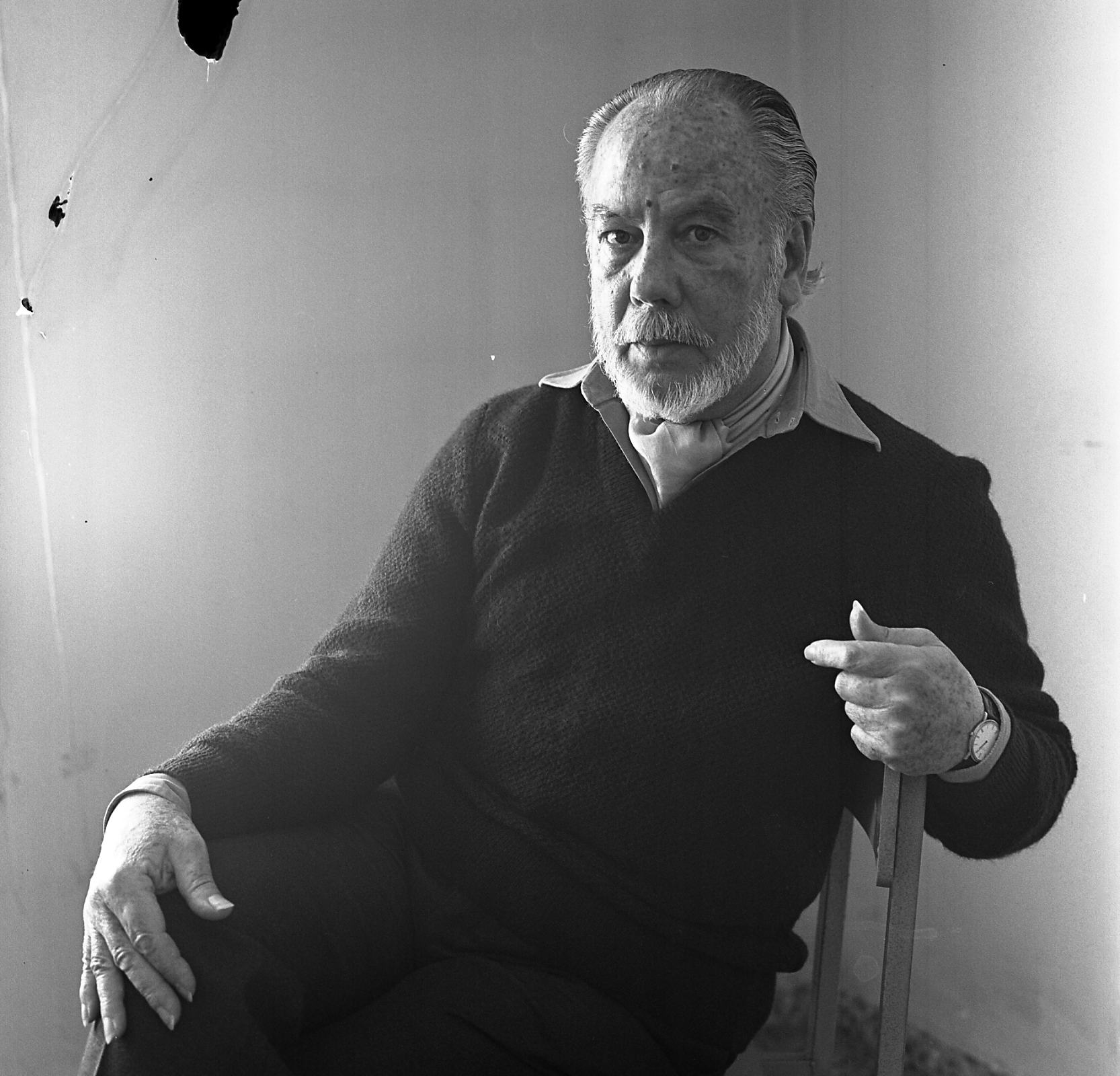
- Born: Ramón Gaya Pomés; 10 October 1910; Murcia, Spain
- Died: 15 October 2005 (aged 95); Valencia, Spain
- Known for: Painting, Drawing, Writer, Poet, Essayist
- Awards: National Award for Plastic Arts (1996); Velázquez Award for Plastic Arts (2002)

Ramón Gaya y Pomés (10 October 1910 – 15 October 2005) was a Spanish painter and writer.

== Biography ==
Ramón Gaya was born in Murcia to Catalan parents Salvador Gaya and Josefa Pomés. His parents had moved to Murcia so Salvador could better engage in his profession of lithography. Ramón's father had some painter friends, Pedro Flores and Luis Garay, Christopher Hall and Darsie Japp, who helped instruct Gaya in art in his early years. He left school early to pursue the profession of painter. Already at the age of 17, Gaya had his first major exhibition in Paris. He became involved with Frederico Garcia Lorca's theatre drawing sets and was head of the painting department in the Las Missiones Pedagógicas. He was the youngest part of the group named la Generación del 27.

His later works were influenced by the old masters such as Velázquez, Titian as well as Vincent van Gogh.

In June 1936 he married Fé Sanz in Madrid. At the start of the Spanish Civil War he joined the Alliance of Anti-Fascist Intellectuals. His wife Fé Sanz was killed in the bombing of Figueres, during the last days of the war, where his daughter, Alicia survived. With the army he crossed the Pyrenees and spent sixteen days in the concentration camp of Saint-Cyprien. After the war, he went into exile to France, where he was separated from his daughter, and, later to Mexico. In 1956 he returned to Europe and settled down in Rome, Italy. In the 1970s he returned to Spain, Madrid. His work can be seen at Caffé Greco, in Rome.

In 1990, in his hometown of Murcia, in the south-east of Spain, the Ramón Gaya de Murcia Museum was set up, for which the painter gave over a hundred of his works.

Gaya was also active as a writer, poet, and art critic. In the course of his 95-year life he received numerous awards, including the National Award for Plastic Arts in 1996 and the Velázquez Award for Plastic Arts in 2002. In 1999, he received the honorary doctorate from the University of Murcia.

Gaya was considered one of the best painters of Spain of this century and belongs to the last surviving representatives of the generation of 1927.

The Tiber baths (1971)
