= Margarita González Ontiveros =

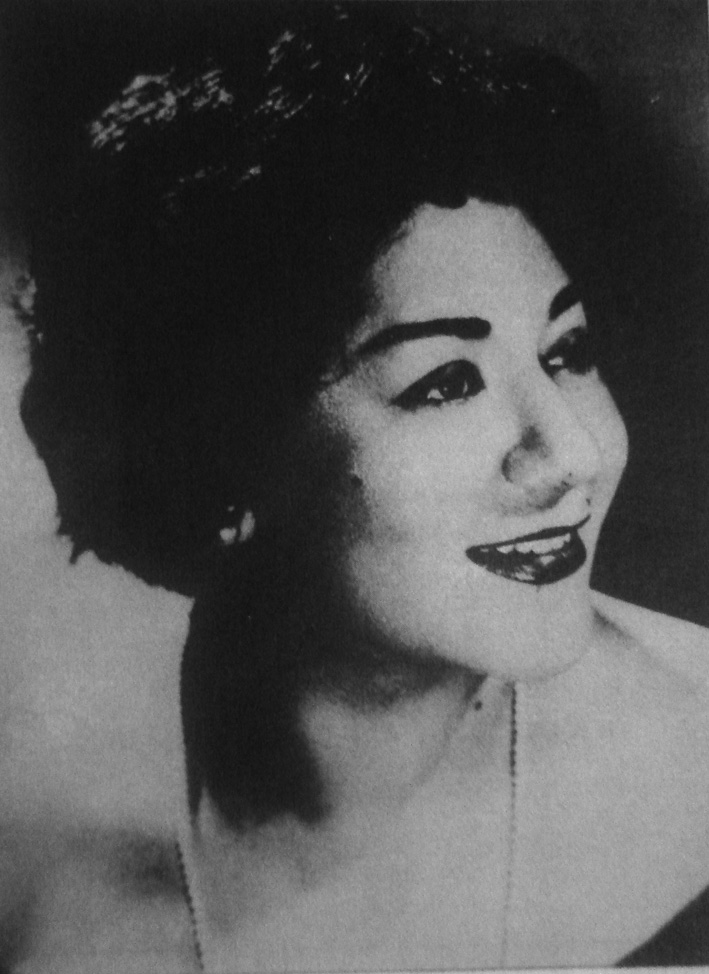
Margarita Gonzalez Ontiveros, 1952

Margarita González Ontiveros (1 September 1918, Chihuahua – 29 May 2006, Cuernavaca) was a Mexican-born mezzo-soprano and contralto. She combined a bel canto technique with interpretation in French, Russian Spanish, Italian, German and Nahuatl. An extremely versatile singer, her repertoire ranged from classical opera seria to the bel canto music of Salvador Moreno Manzano, and Carlos Jiménez Mabarak; further, to the works of Blas Galindo, Manuel Ponce and Tata Nacho. In her career she took challenges as to sing many Mexican pieces of Sonido 13 (thirteenth sound), a microtonal system invented by Julián Carrillo in 1925.

Born in Parral, Chihuahua, and raised by her mother Guadalupe Ontiveros Mardueño and a musician and band director in Oaxaca, Prospero Gonzalez. Her first opera was Wagner's Die Walküre at age 12.

She received her musical education Mexico and established her career in France where she won the first prize of French music interpretation in the École Française du Paris in 1955.

== Career ==
She moved to Mexico City and studied at the Conservatorio Nacional de Música de México, she finished her musical studies very young winning the first prize of Bel canto in a contest at the Mexican Conservatory.

She started her career as a soloist at the Orquesta Sinfónica Nacional under Carlos Chávez, during which time she sang in the National Mexican Opera and on national radio. Later she sang at the Russian Opera of San Francisco.

In 1953 she was given a scholarship to perfect her studies in Europe, this allowed her to perform in many international contests in Munich, Vercelli and Geneva in which she won a silver medal.

In 1955 she won the First Prize of Interpretation of French Music in the École Française du Paris. In that same year she was signed for a tour to Morocco, Rabat and Casablanca. The tour continued to the Spanish cities of Seville, Malaga and Barcelona.

In Paris, she signed for an LP record with Barclay Records, with Mexican composers like Tata Nacho, Manuel Ponce, José López Alavez and Salvador Moreno Manzano.

She owned a remarkable tessitura with a vocal range that allowed her to sing in microtonal quarter tones, eights and sixteens in Julian Carrillo's compositions.

She was the first mezzo-soprano in the world who sung in Nahuatl or Mexica language in such exclusive places as the Metropolitan Opera, Carnegie Hall and La Scala in Milan.

The tone of the voice was warm, velvety, profound; the color and deep rich tones without vibrato.
